= Britney Spears: Live and More! =

Live and More!

Video by Britney Spears
- Released: December 12, 2000
- Recorded: March 17–October 7, 2000
- Genre: Pop
- Length: 80 minutes
- Label: Jive
- Director: Nigel Dick; Bruce Gowers; Joseph Kahn; Dave Meyers
- Producer: Nina D'luhy; Tom Fanning; Paul Flattery; Steve Higgins; Ryan Polito; Gregg Sills; Greg Tharpe

Britney Spears chronology
Time Out with Britney Spears (1999)	Live and More! (2000)	Britney: The Videos (2001)

Live and More! (alternatively titled Britney in Hawaii: Live and More!) is the second video album by American singer Britney Spears. It was released on December 12, 2000, by Jive Records.

Live and More! features the Fox television special Britney in Hawaii, which showcased Spears' concert at the Hilton Hawaiian Village in Honolulu on April 24, 2000, as part of her (You Drive Me) Crazy Tour. It also includes sketches from Saturday Night Live's May 13 episode, which Spears hosted, and three music videos. A commercial success, the album peaked at number two on the US Top Music Videos and was certified triple platinum by the Recording Industry Association of America (RIAA).

== Critical reception ==
Professional ratings
Review scores
Source	Rating
AllMusic	3.5/5 stars

Britney Spears: Live and More! received a positive review from AllMusic, receiving three and a half out of five stars.

== Commercial performance ==
In the United States, Live and More! debuted at number three on the Top Music Videos on December 30, 2000. After weeks of fluctuating within the top ten, it peaked at number two on April 14, 2001. The album was certified triple platinum by the Recording Industry Association of America (RIAA) on November 15, denoting shipments of 300,000 units. In the United Kingdom, Live and More! peaked at number two, spending 20 non-consecutive weeks within the top ten, and was certified platinum by the British Phonographic Industry (BPI).

== Track listing ==
Live and More!
No.	Title	Length
1.	"(You Drive Me) Crazy" (live from Waikiki Beach)
2.	"Sometimes" (live from Waikiki Beach)
3.	"From the Bottom of My Broken Heart" (live from Waikiki Beach)
4.	"Born to Make You Happy" (live from Waikiki Beach)
5.	"Oops!... I Did It Again" (live from Waikiki Beach)
6.	"Don't Let Me Be the Last to Know" (live from Waikiki Beach)
7.	"The Beat Goes On" (live from Waikiki Beach)
8.	"...Baby One More Time" (live from Waikiki Beach)
9.	"Britney Gets Personal" (Britney in Hawaii)
10.	"Britney Hangs with Woodrow" (Saturday Night Live)
11.	"Dance Rehearsal at Waimea Falls" (Britney in Hawaii)
12.	"Britney Throws a Surprise Party" (Britney in Hawaii)
13.	"Britney Does the Hula" (Britney in Hawaii)
14.	"Britney Judges Dancer Try-outs" (Saturday Night Live)
15.	"Britney Goes to School" (Britney in Hawaii)
16.	"Britney as Dawn Pavlowski on Morning Latte" (Saturday Night Live)
17.	"Lucky" (music video)
18.	"Oops!... I Did It Again" (music video)
19.	"Stronger" (music video)

Notes

- Special features include a video jukebox, a photo gallery, an interview and weblink information.
- The performance of "(You Drive Me) Crazy" on Waikiki Beach suffered from a sound issue, and needed to be redone. The songs performed were shorter on the television broadcast and Live and More!. Spears also performed "I Will Be There", Joe performed "I Wanna Know" to Spears, and Destiny's Child performed "Say My Name" mid-show, after "From the Bottom of My Broken Heart", but those performances were excluded from Live and More!.

== Charts ==
Weekly chart performance for Live and More!
Chart (2001)	Peak position
Japanese Music DVD (Oricon)	45
UK Music Videos (OCC)	2
US Music Videos (Billboard)	2

== Certifications ==
Certifications and sales for Live and More!
Region	Certification	Certified units/sales
France (SNEP)	Platinum	20,000^{*}
Germany (BVMI)	Gold	25,000^{^}
United Kingdom (BPI)	Platinum	50,000^{^}
United States (RIAA)	3× Platinum	300,000^{^}
^{*} Sales figures based on certification alone.^{^} Shipments figures based on certification alone.

== Release history ==
Release dates and formats for Live and More!
Region	Date	Format(s)	Label(s)	Ref.
United States	December 12, 2000	DVD; VHS	Jive	
Germany	March 9, 2001	DVD	BMG	
France	March 12, 2001	DVD	Jive	
United Kingdom	April 16, 2001	DVD	Jive	
Japan	April 18, 2001	DVD	BMG	
