= (You Drive Me) Crazy Tour =

2000 concert tour by Britney Spears

- National tour by Britney Spears
- Cover of the tour's concert program book
- Location: North America
- Associated albums: ...Baby One More Time; Oops!... I Did It Again
- Start date: March 8, 2000
- End date: April 24, 2000
- Legs: 1
- No. of shows: 25

Britney Spears concert chronology
- ...Baby One More Time Tour (1999); (You Drive Me) Crazy Tour (2000); Oops!... I Did It Again Tour (2000–2001)

The (You Drive Me) Crazy Tour (also known as the Crazy 2k Tour) was the second concert tour by American entertainer Britney Spears, launched in supporting of her first and second studio albums, ...Baby One More Time (1999) and Oops!... I Did It Again (2000), respectively. The tour was formulated as a continuation of the ...Baby One More Time Tour (1999) and as a prelude to the then-upcoming Oops!... I Did It Again Tour (2000). It was sponsored by Got Milk? and Polaroid.

The tour was divided into various segments, with each segment being followed by an interlude into the next segment, ending with an encore. The setlist consisted of nine songs, with seven tracks from ...Baby One More Time and two from Oops!... I Did It Again, her then-upcoming album. The concert in Hawaii was recorded and broadcast on Fox and a DVD entitled Britney Spears: Live and More! was released in November 2000.

== Background and development ==
On December 17, 1999, during the premiere of the music video for "From the Bottom of My Broken Heart" on Total Request Live, Spears called the show to announce March US tour dates. The tour was designed as a continuation of the ...Baby One More Time Tour and a prelude to her future world tour. The leg's main sponsor was Got Milk?. Media director Peter Gardiner explained, "Britney is magic with teen-age girls, and that's an absolutely crucial target for milk". Spears shot an advertising campaign to be shown before her performances began. The secondary sponsor was Polaroid and the corporation released the Polaroid I-Zone as the official camera of the tour. Spears also used the I-Zone onstage to take pictures of the audience and further promote the product.

The stage of the (You Drive Me) Crazy Tour was similar to that of the ...Baby One More Time Tour, although much bigger. There were many special effects, including smoke machines and fireworks that erupted during the show. There was a giant projection screen that resembled the magical mirror from Snow White and the Seven Dwarfs (1937). Also present was a mechanical magic carpet in which Spears sat and flew over the first 100 feet above the crowd. Spears, who had five costumes changes during the show, was joined on stage by eight dancers. The setlist consisted of nine songs, six from her debut album, two songs from her then-upcoming album, Oops!... I Did It Again (2000) and a cover of Sonny & Cher's hit "The Beat Goes On".

== Concert synopsis ==
The show began with a "high school"-themed skit, in which the dancers walked out from a row of student lockers, remaining onstage until a school bell sounded. They all sat at their desks as a female "teacher" called their names for attendance. Upon calling the name "Spears", Britney Spears appeared at the top of a staircase amidst a cloud of smoke, wearing a tight top and white stretch-pants. At this point, all on-stage performed a short dance mix of "...Baby One More Time". Spears then entered one of the lockers and appeared in another one on the opposite end of the stage, to perform "(You Drive Me) Crazy". Spears then briefly spoke to the audience, continuing the "intimate" moment with "Born to Make You Happy" and "I Will Be There". After a dance interlude, Spears appeared again, this time sitting on a magic carpet which lifted over the audience, singing "Don't Let Me Be the Last to Know". When she returned to the stage, she performed the then-brand-new song "Oops!... I Did It Again". Spears addressed the audience again before the "Who is the Ultimate Heartbreaker?" interlude, in which her dancers chose a male audience member to come onstage. Spears then took to the stage wearing a different jacket and dedicated a performance of "From the Bottom of My Broken Heart" to the lucky audience member chosen. She took off her jacket to reveal a pair of black pants that featured a sequined red heart in the back and performed a cover of Sonny and Cher's hit "The Beat Goes On". After two interludes and an introduction of her dancers and band members, Spears went-on to perform her hit "Sometimes". The encore consisted of a dance-oriented performance of "...Baby One More Time".

== Critical response ==
Jae-Ha Kim of the Chicago Sun-Times said that Spears "showed why she has got a leg up on blonder competitors such as Christina Aguilera, Jessica Simpson and Mandy Moore. Aguilera may have a better voice (and a Grammy to validate it), but Spears has that 'it' factor that worked for pinup queens of the past, such as Farrah Fawcett". Adam Graham of Central Michigan Life commented that "although the show was only about 10 songs long and the authenticity of her voice was in question throughout, it was really truly hard to walk away feeling anything but completely gratified". Dave Tianen of the Milwaukee Journal Sentinel believed that the show "was energetic, good-humored, fast-paced and bright".

During the tour, accusations of lip synching arose. Spears talked to Rolling Stone about the accusations, saying,

"There's a delay in the screen above me, so if you listen to the music and watch the screen, they don't sync up. I think that confuses people. But I'm singing every song. I'm singing my ass off. [...] There are times during the show, when I'm dancing so much, where I get out of breath, and we have a signal where I'm dying and they'll help me out. Believe me, I'd give anything to do a show where I just sit there and sing".

== Broadcasts and recordings ==
On April 24, 2000, the concert at Hilton Hawaiian Village in Honolulu, Hawaii was taped. On June 5, 2000, it was broadcast in a special on Fox. On November 21, 2000, Jive Records released the Britney Spears: Live and More! DVD, which included the Fox special. It was certified three-times platinum by the Recording Industry Association of America (RIAA) for shipment of 300,000 copies in DVD units.

== Supporting acts ==
- LFO (North America) (select venues)
- Destiny's Child (Hawaii)

== Set list ==
The following set list is from the show on March 14, 2000, in Auburn Hills, Michigan. It is not representative of all concerts for the duration of the tour.

1. "(You Drive Me) Crazy"
2. "Born to Make You Happy"
3. "I Will Be There"
4. "Don't Let Me Be the Last to Know"
5. "Oops!... I Did It Again"
6. "From the Bottom of My Broken Heart"
7. "The Beat Goes On"
8. "Sometimes"
  Encore
9. "...Baby One More Time"

== Tour dates ==
List of concerts, showing date, city, and venue
Date (2000)	City	Venue
March 8	Pensacola	Pensacola Civic Center
March 9	Birmingham	BJCC Arena
March 10 (Note: The March 10, 2000 was originally scheduled to take place on March 11, 2000.)	North Little Rock	Alltel Arena
March 12	Memphis	Pyramid Arena
March 13	Louisville	Freedom Hall
March 14 (Note: The March 14, 2000 was originally scheduled to take place on March 20, 2000.)	Auburn Hills	The Palace of Auburn Hills
March 15 (Note: The March 15, 2000 was originally scheduled to take place on March 16, 2000.)	Cincinnati	Firstar Center
March 19	Grand Rapids	Van Andel Arena
March 20 (Note: The March 20, 2000 was originally scheduled to take place on March 22, 2000.)	Moline	The MARK of the Quad Cities
March 21	Madison	Kohl Center
March 22	Rosemont	Allstate Arena
March 23	Rosemont	Allstate Arena
March 25	Worcester	Worcester's Centrum Centre
March 26	Baltimore	Baltimore Arena
March 27	Albany	Pepsi Arena
March 29 (Note: The March 29, 2000 was originally scheduled to take place on April 1, 2000.)	Greensboro	Greensboro Coliseum
March 31 (Note: The March 31, 2000 was originally scheduled to take place on April 7, 2000 at the USF Sun Dome.)	Tampa	Ice Palace
April 1	Miami	American Airlines Arena
April 2	Daytona Beach	Ocean Center
April 4	New Orleans	New Orleans Arena
April 6 (Note: The April 6, 2000 was originally scheduled to take place on March 30, 2000.)	Greenville	BI-LO Center
April 7	Roanoke	Roanoke Civic Center
April 8	Charleston	Charleston Civic Center
April 9 (Note: The April 9, 2000 was originally scheduled to take place on April 2, 2000.)	Knoxville	Thompson Boling Arena
April 24	Honolulu	Hilton Hawaiian Village

== Cancelled shows ==
List of cancelled concerts, showing date, city, and venue
Date (2000)	City	Venue
March 14	Evansville	Roberts Stadium
March 29	Richmond	Richmond Coliseum
April 6	Jacksonville	Jacksonville Coliseum
April 8	Sunrise	National Car Rental Center
April 9	Fort Myers	TECO Arena

== Box office score data ==
Venue	City	Tickets sold / Available	Gross revenue
Pyramid Arena	Memphis	16,906 / 16,906 (100%)	$578,845
