= Born to Make You Happy =

1999 single by Britney Spears

Single by Britney Spears

from the album ...Baby One More Time
- B-side: "(You Drive Me) Crazy" (Jazzy Jim's hip-hop mix)
- Released: December 6, 1999
- Recorded: May 1998
- Studio: Cheiron (Stockholm)
- Genre: Pop; teen pop
- Length: 3:35 (radio edit); 4:03 (album version)
- Label: Jive
- Songwriters: Kristian Lundin; Andreas Carlsson
- Producer: Kristian Lundin

Britney Spears singles chronology
"(You Drive Me) Crazy" (1999)	"Born to Make You Happy" (1999)	"From the Bottom of My Broken Heart" (1999)

Music video
- "Born To Make You Happy" on YouTube

"Born to Make You Happy" is a song by American singer Britney Spears from her debut studio album, ...Baby One More Time (1999). It was released on December 6, 1999, by Jive Records, as the fourth single from the album in Europe. Spears—whose vision for her sound differed stylistically from that of her producer's—was unhappy with the sexual overtones of the song, and the song underwent at least one re-write before its release. The singer first recorded the vocals for the track in May 1998, which were later re-recorded in September 1999 for the 'Bonus Remix' of the song. The teen pop song alludes to a relationship that a woman desires to correct, not quite understanding what went wrong, as she comes to realize that she was "born to make [her lover] happy".

"Born to Make You Happy" received praise from music critics for Spears' vocals along with criticism towards the lyrical message. The song achieved success throughout Europe, topping the charts in Ireland, Scotland and the United Kingdom, while reaching the top five in Belgium, the Czech Republic, Finland, Germany, Greece, Iceland, the Netherlands, Norway, Romania, Sweden and Switzerland. An accompanying music video, directed by Bille Woodruff, was released. The video portrays Spears dreaming that she is with her lover, while she sings and dances during the majority of the video. Spears has performed "Born to Make You Happy" on four concert tours.

== Background ==
Before recording her 1999 debut album, ...Baby One More Time, Britney Spears had originally envisioned it in style of Sheryl Crow's music, but "younger [and] more adult contemporary". However, the singer agreed with her label's appointment of producers, who had the objective to reach a teen public at the time. She flew to Cheiron Studios in Stockholm, Sweden, where half of the album was recorded from May 1998, with producers Max Martin, Denniz Pop and Rami Yacoub, among others. "Born to Make You Happy" was written and produced by Kristian Lundin, and co-written by Andreas Carlsson, and was the first work by the duo. The song was mixed at Cheiron Studios by Max Martin. Esbjörn Öhrwall played the guitar, while keyboards and programming was done by Lundin. Background vocals were provided by Carlsson and Nana Hedin. In an early version of "Born To Make You Happy", additional background vocals can be heard in the chorus which were later removed in the final version.

The "bonus remix" of "Born To Make You Happy" was recorded in September 1999, following the record label's idea to re-record and remix the song to have more "punch". This idea came from the success of the remix release of the album's previous single "(You Drive Me) Crazy". Within 24 hours of hearing the new remix, Clive Calder decided to keep the original album version for the single release, and to have the remix as the B-side to the single.

"Born to Make You Happy" was released in Europe as the fourth single from ...Baby One More Time on December 6, 1999. It was not released as a single in the United States, where "From the Bottom of My Broken Heart" was released as the album's fourth single instead.

== Composition ==
"Born to Make You Happy" (1999)
A 22-second sample of the song's chorus, where Spears sings "I was 'Born to Make You Happy'".

"Born to Make You Happy" is a teen pop and pop song that lasts for four minutes and three seconds. The song is composed in the key of B minor and is set in time signature of common time, with a moderately slow tempo of 84 beats per minute. Spears vocal range spans over an octave, from F♯_{3} to B_{4}. The song's lyrics are about a relationship that a woman desires to correct, not quite understanding what went wrong, as she comes to realize that "I don't know how to live without your love/I was born to make you happy". Writing for Pink News, Mayer Nissim described its lyrics as being about "capturing that pain, denial, and self-pitying misery right after things go south". "Born to Make You Happy" has a basic sequence of Bm–G–D–A as its chord progression.

David Gauntlett, author of Media, gender, and identity: an introduction (2002), noted that, despite wanting her lover next to her in the song, Spears' "fans see her as assertive, strong and confident, and an example that young women can make it on their own". The singer revealed in an interview with Rolling Stone, the writers had to re-write the original lyrics of the song. "I asked them to change the words to 'Born to Make You Happy.' It was a sexual song," she revealed. "I said, 'This may be a little old for me.' Because of the image thing, I don't want to go over the top. If I come out being Miss Prima Donna, that wouldn't be smart. I want to have a place to grow".

== Critical response ==
Kyle Anderson of MTV considered the chorus of "Born to Make You Happy" more than "a little bit off-putting," saying the first lines of it "could be a sentiment that a lovelorn 16-year-old can understand, but it also sounds like Spears is in training to be a geisha". Craig MacInnis of Hamilton Spectator said "["Born to Make You Happy"] verges on the sort of boy-worshipping dreck that even Tiffany would have sniffed at". Mike Ross of Edmond Sun said, as Spears emotes in the song, "the message behind the music is worse than mere sweet nothings. [...] So much for Girl Power". Amanda Murray of Sputnikmusic considered "Born to Make You Happy" a "proficient but entirely unrememberable song," while Andy Petch-Jex of musicOMH considered the song an "early classic". Christopher Rosa, from Glamour, deemed it Spears' tenth best song, calling it a "euphoric slice of late nineties bubblegum, featuring some of her fullest vocals and one of her most memorable bridges". Shannon Barbour from Cosmopolitan called it a "prime stare-out-the-widow-pretending-to-be-in-an-emotional-music-video song". Digital Spy's Alim Kheraj praised "Spears' pure vocals and the dreamlike production".

For Alex Macpherson from The Guardian, it's one of the best examples of Spears' "distressing vulnerability" as well as her best song; "a determined erasure of the autonomous self [...] 'Born to Make You Happy' is horrifying as text and irresistible as pop, and the two are inextricable". While reviewing ...Baby One More Time on its 20th anniversary, Billboard's Chuck Arnold felt that "the old-fashioned sentiment of this song - that a girl is born to please her guy - feels even more antiquated 20 years later. Still, this is a teen-pop dream". For Daniel Megarry from Gay Times, it was one of the "standout tracks" from ...Baby One More Time and wrote that "it’s impossible not to feel nostalgia when the melancholic beats of 'Born To Make You Happy' grace your eardrums". Mayer Nissim pointed out that "on the surface the lyrics are more than a little limp and pathetic, but [...] the powerful pop backing and unbreaking vocals show that Britney will more than live to fight (and love) another day".

== Commercial performance ==
On January 29, 2000, "Born to Make You Happy" debuted at number one on the UK singles chart becoming Spears' second UK number one. The song shipped over 400,000 copies in the United Kingdom, earning a gold certification by the British Phonographic Industry (BPI) in February 2021. It is her sixth best-selling single in the country. In Ireland, the song also entered the Irish Singles Chart at number one on January 20, 2000, while peaking at number two on the European chart. In Sweden, "Born to Make You Happy" debuted at number four on December 23, 1999, peaking at number two in the following week. The song has shipped over 30,000 copies in the country, earning a platinum certification by the International Federation of the Phonographic Industry (IFPI). In Germany, the song earned a gold certification by The Federal Association of Music Industry (BMVI), after peaking at number three on the charts. In France, "Born to Make You Happy" reached number nine, and was certified gold by the Syndicat National de l'Édition Phonographique (SNEP). It failed to reach the top 10 only in Spain, peaking at number 16. The single was never released in North America or Oceania.

== Promotion ==
=== Music video ===
The music video for "Born to Make You Happy" features Spears in a futuristic room.

Jive Records commissioned a music video for the song to be directed by Bille Woodruff on October 24–25, 1999. It was produced under Geneva Films, while the choreography was created by Wade Robson. The video premiered on November 13, 1999. The narrative of the video shows Spears dreaming as she sleeps in her room. As the dream begins, Spears is shown in a blue and silver futuristic room with several different levels, where she sings and walks around, and puts her feet on the wall while wearing a shiny silver outfit. MTV news reporter Ellen Thompson considered it the sexiest moment of the music video. As the video continues, Spears is seen on top of the apartment building she lives in, performing a dance segment in a red top and black skirt with a few backup dancers. The black skirt Spears is seen wearing was never intended for the music video, it belonged to her stylist Claudette Lalí and Spears took a liking to the design and ended up wearing it for the dance sequence. The following scenes shows the singer wearing white clothes and singing in the room in which she is sleeping, while her love interest comes into her room to see her. Together, they start a pillow fight that shortly ends after Spears is shown again in her room still sleeping, however, now with a smile upon her face. A longer dance segment intercalates with all the scenes during the whole video.

Anna Ben Yehuda, from Time Out magazine, called it Spears' eleventh best video; "we don't know why Brit is dreaming of making someone happy by dancing on a stage in space, but we don't care, because that choreography is dope". Negative criticism came from Bustle's Kaitlin Reilly, who panned it as "patently ridiculous".

=== Music video controversy ===
Since the music video debuted, it was instantly rumored that Spears was meant to be pregnant in the video; however, it was removed at the last minute due to being too controversial with Spears only being 17 years old. Allegedly, once the idea was leaked to the press and received a negative reception, Jive canceled the idea and instead went with the dance-heavy version of the video that was released. Viewers believed that in the opening shot of the video, Spears is portrayed to be pregnant laying on her bed dreaming about her lover and were shots from the original music video. In 2022, former stylist Claudette Lalí held an Instagram live-stream denying the rumors of Spears being pregnant in the video, and that the concept was never thought of. Lalí also presented viewers with some of the original paperwork for the music video, which showed no reference to any concept of teenage pregnancy.

=== Live performances ===
Spears performed the song for the very first time at her L'Oreal Hair Zone Mall Tour in New York City, USA on July 1, 1998. "Born to Make You Happy" has been performed by Spears on four tours. On her first big tour, ...Baby One More Time Tour, she sang the song seated on a staircase, while on her second tour, Crazy 2k, the performance of the song included a full dance segment. On the Oops!... I Did It Again Tour, Spears performed "Born to Make You Happy" wearing pajamas and slippers, with a dance segment near the end. "Born to Make You Happy" was performed for the last time on Dream Within a Dream Tour, where Spears emerged from the middle of a giant musical box on the stage as a ballerina, to perform the song in a medley with "Lucky" and "Sometimes", right after the performance of "Overprotected". Spears also performed "From the Bottom of My Broken Heart" and "Born to Make You Happy" on Disney Channel in Concert in 1999. The performances were recorded and included on Spears' first home video release, Time Out with Britney Spears.

== Track listings ==
- European CD
1. "Born to Make You Happy" (Radio Edit) – 3:35
2. "Born to Make You Happy" (Bonus remix) – 3:40
- European maxi CD
1. "Born to Make You Happy" (Radio Edit) – 3:35
2. "Born to Make You Happy" (Bonus remix) – 3:40
3. "(You Drive Me) Crazy" (Jazzy Jim's hip-hop mix) – 3:40
4. "...Baby One More Time" (answering machine message) – 0:21
- UK maxi CD
1. "Born to Make You Happy" (Radio Edit) – 3:35
2. "Born to Make You Happy" (Bonus remix) – 3:40
3. "(You Drive Me) Crazy" (Jazzy Jim's hip-hop mix) – 3:40
- Cassette
1. "Born to Make You Happy" (radio edit) – 3:35
2. "Born to Make You Happy" (Bonus Remix) – 3:40
3. "...Baby One More Time" (answering machine message) – 0:21
- European 7-inch vinyl
1. "Born to Make You Happy" (album version) – 4:03
2. "(You Drive Me) Crazy" (Jazzy Jim's hip-hop mix) – 3:40

== Credits and personnel ==
- Britney Spears – lead vocals
- Kristian Lundin – songwriting, producer, keyboards, programming
- Andreas Carlsson – songwriting, background vocals
- Nana Hedin – background vocals
- Esbjörn Öhrwall – bass, guitar
- Max Martin – mixing
- Michael Tucker – pro-tools engineer
- Reza Safina – assistant engineer
- Tom Coyne – audio mastering

== Charts ==
=== Weekly charts ===
1999–2000 weekly chart performance for "Born to Make You Happy"
Chart (1999–2000)	Peak position
Austria (Ö3 Austria Top 40)	8
Belgium (Ultratop 50 Flanders)	5
Belgium (Ultratop 50 Wallonia)	4
Czech Republic (IFPI)	2
Europe (European Hot 100 Singles)	2
Europe (European Radio Top 50)	1
Finland (Suomen virallinen lista)	5
France (SNEP)	9
Germany (GfK)	3
Greece (IFPI)	4
Iceland (Íslenski Listinn Topp 40)	3
Ireland (IRMA)	1
Italy (FIMI)	8
Italy Airplay (Music & Media)	13
Netherlands (Dutch Top 40)	4
Netherlands (Single Top 100)	6
Norway (VG-lista)	3
Romania (Romanian Top 100)	3
Scottish Singles Sales (Official Charts)	1
Spain (Promusicae)	16
Sweden (Sverigetopplistan)	2
Switzerland (Schweizer Hitparade)	3
UK Singles (Official Charts)	1
UK Airplay (Music Week)	1
UK Indie (Official Charts)	1

2025 weekly chart performance for "Born to Make You Happy"
Chart (2025)	Peak position
Poland (Polish Airplay Top 100)	72

=== Year-end charts ===
1999 year-end chart performance for "Born to Make You Happy"
Chart (1999)	Position
Netherlands (Dutch Top 40)	151
Sweden (Hitlistan)	78

2000 year-end chart performance for "Born to Make You Happy"
Chart (2000)	Position
Belgium (Ultratop 50 Flanders)	46
Belgium (Ultratop 50 Wallonia)	70
Europe (European Hot 100)	17
Europe (European Radio Top 100)	26
France (SNEP)	59
Germany (Media Control)	36
Ireland (IRMA)	44
Netherlands (Dutch Top 40)	66
Netherlands (Single Top 100)	79
Romania (Romanian Top 100)	40
Sweden (Hitlistan)	38
Switzerland (Schweizer Hitparade)	23
UK Singles (OCC)	32
UK Airplay (Music Week)	20

=== All-time charts ===
All-time chart performance for "Born to Make You Happy"
Chart	Position
Poland (Radio Złote Przeboje)	168

== Certifications ==
Certifications for "Born to Make You Happy"
Region	Certification	Certified units/sales
France (SNEP)	Gold	250,000^{*}
Germany (BVMI)	Gold	250,000^{^}
Sweden (GLF)	Platinum	30,000^{^}
United Kingdom (BPI)	Gold	400,000^{‡}
^{*} Sales figures based on certification alone.^{^} Shipments figures based on certification alone.^{‡} Sales+streaming figures based on certification alone.

== Release history ==
Release dates and formats for "Born to Make You Happy"
Region	Date	Format(s)	Label(s)	Ref.
France	December 6, 1999	Maxi CD	Jive	
Germany	December 6, 1999	Maxi CD	Rough Trade	
United Kingdom	January 17, 2000	Cassette; maxi CD	Jive	
France	February 8, 2000	CD	Jive	

== Bibliography ==
- Gauntlett, David (2002). Media, gender, and identity: an introduction. Routledge. ISBN 978-0-415-18960-6.
- Hughes, Mark (2005). Buzzmarketing: get people to talk about your stuff. Penguin Group. ISBN 978-1-59184-092-3.
