= Oops!... I Did It Again Tour =

2000–2001 concert tour by Britney Spears

- Tour by Britney Spears
- Autographed promotional poster for the tour
- Location: Europe; North America; South America
- Associated album: Oops!... I Did It Again
- Start date: June 20, 2000
- End date: January 18, 2001
- Legs: 3
- No. of shows: 89
- Supporting acts: 2Gether; A-Teens; Aaron Carter; BBMak; C-Note; Don Philip; Dream; i5; Innosense; Josh Keaton; Mikaila; No Authority; Nobody's Angel; PYT; Sister2Sister; Take 5
- Box office: US$40.9 million (Note: US$76.47 million in 2025 dollars.)

Britney Spears concert chronology
- (You Drive Me) Crazy Tour (2000); Oops!... I Did It Again Tour (2000–2001); Dream Within a Dream Tour (2001–2002)

The Oops!... I Did It Again Tour (billed as Oops!... I Did It Again Tour 2000) was the third concert tour by American entertainer Britney Spears. It supported her second studio album, Oops!... I Did It Again (2000), and visited North America, Europe, and Brazil. The tour was announced in February 2000, while Spears was in the midst of the Crazy 2k Tour. The stage was much more elaborative than her previous tours and featured video screens, fireworks and moving platforms. The setlist was composed by songs from her first two studio albums, ...Baby One More Time and Oops!... I Did It Again, as well as a few covers. Showco was the sound company, who used the PRISM system to adapt the show to each venue. Spears used a handheld microphone and a headset during the shows, while an ADAT was used to replace her voice during energetic dance routines.

The show consisted of four segments with each segment being followed by an interval to the next segment, and it ended with an encore. The show began with Spears descending from a giant orb. Most of the songs displayed energetic dance routines with the exception of the second segment, which featured mostly ballads. The encore consisted of a performance with fireworks. The Oops!... I Did It Again Tour received positive reviews from critics, who praised Spears's energy onstage as well as the band. It was also a commercial success; the reported dates by Billboard averaged $507,786 in grosses and nearly 15,841 in attendance. Billboard stated that the tour grossed a total of $40.9 million, including 28 European dates, and became one of the highest-grossing tours of 2000. According to Pollstar, it brought a total of $40.5 million only in North America. The Oops!... I Did It Again Tour was broadcast by many channels around the world. Former Wishbone star Mikaila was one of the opening acts for the tour.

== Background ==
On February 22, 2000, Spears announced a summer tour in support of her second studio album, Oops!... I Did It Again (2000). The tour marked the first time Spears toured Europe. She commented, "I'm going to go to Europe, and just basically go everywhere for six months, [...] I've never toured outside of the U.S. I've never experienced other fans in other places, and performing in front of them is going to be so exciting." Before the tour began, Forbes reported that concert promoter SFX Entertainment guaranteed her a minimum of $200,000 per show. Tour sponsors from the 2000 leg of the ...Baby One More Time Tour, Got Milk?, and Polaroid, remained. Clairol's Herbal Essences was also added as a sponsor. Spears recorded a song for the latter called "I've Got the Urge to Herbal" to be used on their radio campaign, though she chose to not attend a photoshoot for the product when she decided to support an 86-day strike by the Screen Actors Guild (SAG). She later donated $1 from each ticket sold from her Inglewood, California show on July 28, 2000 to the union. For the European leg of the tour, Spears originally was going to do a co-headlining tour with NSYNC following the group's No Strings Attached Tour. Spears ended up touring the region solo.

== Development ==
Jamie King was chosen as tour director. Tim Miller and Kevin Antunes served as director of production and musical director, respectively. Mark Foffano was chosen as the lightning director. Spears described the tour as "like a Broadway show". The setlist included material from her first studio album ...Baby One More Time (1999) as well as seven songs from Oops!... I Did It Again. Spears explained, "I've been singing the same material for so long now. It'll be nice to change it up a little bit." She also talked about her expectations for the tour, saying, "I can't wait. I'll have a world tour. I'm going to have more dancers, a bigger stage, more pyro... just a lot bigger". The proscenium stage was much more elaborate than the stage of her previous tour and included video screens, movable platforms and different props. It cost $2.2 million to build. The tone of the show varied from the beginning: for the performance of "Born to Make You Happy", Spears sang in a set resembling a children's bedroom, complete with large toys and a pillow fight routine. On the contrary, she unveiled a more sophisticated image for "Don't Let Me Be the Last to Know", and followed it with raunchy performances for "...Baby One More Time" and "Oops!... I Did It Again".

The sound equipment was provided by Showco who used the PRISM system, which adapted the show for each venue according to its height, width and the coverage required. The sound was mixed by Front of house engineer Monty Lee Wilkes on a combination of Yamaha PM4000 and PM3000 consoles, an unusual choice for Spears's shows. He used dbx 903 compressors for kick and snare drums. The compressors were also used on Spears's microphones, a Shure Beta 58A handheld and a Crown CM-311AE headset-mounted capsule. Spears's vocals were mostly live—pre-recorded vocals ran in parallel on an ADAT machine during the shows, and were used to replace her live microphone when the dance routines became too energetic for good voice control. Spears's band, backline technicians and monitor engineer Raza Sufi were all fitted with in-ear monitors and headset mics, enabling rapid and clear communications around the stage area. Spears did not use them, preferring the ambient sound of a battery of eight Showco SRM wedges spread across the downstage area. These were augmented by Showco SS full-range sidefills and a pair of one-by-18-inch subs on each side of the stage. Sufi also used a dbx 160A to limit Spears's louder moments, while backing vocalists were controlled by a duo of BSS DPR901 dynamic equalizers. Effects were limited to vocal and drum reverbs. Amplification for the wedges and the FOH system were all Crown-based, with a pair of drum stool shakers completing the line-up. All the cables used during the tour were brought from the US, even in Europe, something unusual in audio production.

== Concert synopsis ==
The show began with the video introduction "The Britney Spears Experience", in which three images of Spears welcomed spectators to the show. Then, a giant metal orb was lowered onstage and lifted again to reveal Spears standing behind it, wearing a pink halter top (some shows it was orange), a side silver jacket, and glittery jeans. Spears started with two dance-oriented performances of "(You Drive Me) Crazy" and "Stronger". This was followed by "What U See (Is What U Get)" in which she removed her silver side jacket and she danced on a stripper pole wearing a pink cowboy hat. The act ended with Spears talking to the audience and sitting on a stool to perform "From the Bottom of My Broken Heart" with her guitarist Skip.

After she left the stage, there was a video interlude hosted by NSYNC (via screen) and Spears' two background singers (two female background dancers in Europe) in which contestants did different games in order to meet Spears. She appeared onstage to meet the chosen fan and then welcomed the audience into her bedroom. Wearing white pajamas and slippers, she performed "Born to Make You Happy", which included a dance segment near the end. She then continued with "Lucky" featuring her two background singers (two female background dancers during all the European show) helping Spears getting ready for a typical day. Halfway through the song during the dance break, her male dancers all dressed in navy sailor costumes do a routine before Spears continues the remainder of the song dressed as a ship captain. "Sometimes", in which changed back into her white pajamas and slippers (coincidentally an outfit similar to the one she wore in the music video of the song) and featured Spears' and her dancers throwing teddy bears, beach balls, and squirting the audience with water guns. At the end, she climbed the staircase and briefly spoke to the audience before moving into a performance of "Don't Let Me Be The Last To Know", for which she wore a long white dress trimmed with boa feathers (dressed up much like in the music video as Lucky).

A band interlude showcasing a mix of funk and progressive rock from her band followed, and Spears reappeared to perform her cover of Sonny & Cher's "The Beat Goes On." During the performance, she was lifted into the air wearing a kimono that covered most of the stage. She continued with "Don't Go Knockin' on My Door" (losing the kimono and wearing a full purple jumpsuit) and her cover of The Rolling Stones's "(I Can't Get No) Satisfaction", which ended with a dance sequence set to the original version.

Next, there was a dance interval in which the dancers showed their individual moves while their names appeared on the screens. Spears took the stage again in a conservative schoolgirl outfit to perform "...Baby One More Time." She ripped it off halfway through the song to reveal a cheerleader ensemble. Spears then thanked the audience, took a bow and left the stage. She returned shortly after (wearing a black two-piece jumpsuit imprinted with orange flames) to perform "Oops!... I Did It Again", that included an extended dance break after the second chorus, pyrotechnics and other special effects. She ended the performance disappearing through a tunnel of fire.

== Reception ==
The show received positive reviews from critics. Andrew Miller of The Pitch stated "[the concert] at Sandstone proved that many [of Spears's] criticisms are off-base observations from people who have never actually attended one of these stars' shows. The music came from a talented band, not a DAT, and the bass lines to such songs as "... Baby One More Time" and "The Beat Goes On" rose to a funky growl in the live setting. For another, Spears' vocals were the real thing, as she sang in an alluringly low tone [...] but capably hit the high notes [...], however, she left the upper-octave duties to her background singers [...] during Spears' most strenuous dance routines". Richard Leiby of The Washington Post believed that the show "[was] great". Letta Tayler of Newsday said "For half the show, she remained the old Britney, the budding teen who dreamed of romance. But the rest of the time, she was a full-throttle tease, with sprayed- on clothes, a hard-edged attitude and a harder edge to her techno and hip-hop- coated pop to match".

Jon Pareles of The New York Times stated "What you get from this 18-year-old singer is a big smile, a little voice, gushes of sincerity, hardworking dance routines, shameless advertising and a determination to play both sides of pubescence for all they're worth". Jim Farber of New York Daily News commented that "Despite such spicy bits, the core of Britney's concert suffered from the familiarity and cheesiness of all teen road shows these days. The sparklers, explosions and mandatory flying dancers conformed to the corniness of theme park entertainment". Roger Moore of the Orlando Sentinel analyzed Spears to emulate "a lot of Janet Jackson's old concert act and cleaned it up for a younger audience", also noting choreography resembling "Rhythm Nation" precision."

The ticket prices were set at $32 in North America. The reported dates averaged $507,786 in grosses and 15,841 in attendance. Susanne Ault of Billboard also reported that many of the shows sold out in one day. According to Billboard, the tour earned $30.1 million in North America and another $10.8 million from 28 dates in Europe that were not reported, bringing a total gross of $40.9 million. Pollstar stated it had a total gross of $40.5 million counting the North American dates only. It became the tenth highest-grossing tour of the year in North America, as well as the second highest-grossing tour by a solo artist, only behind Tina Turner's Twenty Four Seven Tour.

== Broadcasts ==
On November 30, 2000, the September 20 concert at the Louisiana Superdome in New Orleans aired on Fox. The special was titled Britney Spears: There's No Place Like Home. One of the shows performed at London Arena was filmed and broadcast by Sky1.

== Set list ==
1. "(You Drive Me) Crazy"
2. "Stronger"
3. "What U See (Is What U Get)"
4. "From the Bottom of My Broken Heart"
5. "Born to Make You Happy"
6. "Lucky"
7. "Sometimes"
8. "Don't Let Me Be the Last to Know"
9. "The Beat Goes On"
10. "Don't Go Knockin' on My Door"
11. "(I Can't Get No) Satisfaction"
12. "...Baby One More Time"

Encore
13. "Oops!... I Did It Again"

Notes
- During some shows Spears performed the "Exclusive Rap Freestyle",during the "(You Drive Me) Crazy" breakdown, a track she later recorded in 2003, and was released in Ryan Leslie's mixtape "The Talented Mr. Leslie".

== Shows ==
List of 2000 concerts
| Date (2000) | City | Country | Venue | Attendance | Revenue |
|---|---|---|---|---|---|
| June 20 | Columbia | United States | Merriweather Post Pavilion | —N/a | —N/a |
| June 21 | Hartford | United States | Meadows Music Theatre | —N/a | —N/a |
| June 23 | Darien | United States | Darien Lake Performing Arts Center | —N/a | —N/a |
| June 24 | Hershey | United States | Hersheypark Stadium | 28,701 / 28,701 | $1,014,096 |
| June 25 | Scranton | United States | Coors Light Amphitheatre | —N/a | —N/a |
| June 27 | Wantagh | United States | Jones Beach Theater | 56,550 / 56,550 | $2,055,861 |
| June 28 | Wantagh | United States | Jones Beach Theater | 56,550 / 56,550 | $2,055,861 |
| June 29 | Wantagh | United States | Jones Beach Theater | 56,550 / 56,550 | $2,055,861 |
| June 30 | Wantagh | United States | Jones Beach Theater | 56,550 / 56,550 | $2,055,861 |
| July 2 | Holmdel | United States | PNC Bank Arts Center | —N/a | —N/a |
| July 3 | Holmdel | United States | PNC Bank Arts Center | —N/a | —N/a |
| July 4 | Bristow | United States | Nissan Pavilion | —N/a | —N/a |
| July 5 | Camden | United States | E-Centre | —N/a | —N/a |
| July 7 | Tinley Park | United States | World Music Theatre | —N/a | —N/a |
| July 8 | Milwaukee | United States | Marcus Amphitheater | —N/a | —N/a |
| July 9 | Clarkston | United States | Pine Knob Music Theatre | —N/a | —N/a |
| July 10 | Clarkston | United States | Pine Knob Music Theatre | —N/a | —N/a |
| July 16 | Maryland Heights | United States | Riverport Amphitheatre | —N/a | —N/a |
| July 17 | Bonner Springs | United States | Sandstone Amphitheater | —N/a | —N/a |
| July 19 | Dallas | United States | The Music Centre at Fair Park | —N/a | —N/a |
| July 20 | San Antonio | United States | Alamodome | —N/a | —N/a |
| July 21 | The Woodlands | United States | Cynthia Woods Mitchell Pavilion | 25,916 / 25,972 | $912,149 |
| July 22 | The Woodlands | United States | Cynthia Woods Mitchell Pavilion | 25,916 / 25,972 | $912,149 |
| July 27 | Albuquerque | United States | Mesa del Sol | —N/a | —N/a |
| July 28 | Phoenix | United States | Blockbuster Desert Sky Pavilion | —N/a | —N/a |
| July 29 | Irvine | United States | Verizon Wireless Amphitheatre | —N/a | —N/a |
| July 30 | Inglewood | United States | Great Western Forum | 25,756 / 29,000 | $977,849 |
| July 31 (Note: The July 31, 2000 concert at Great Western Forum in Inglewood was originally scheduled to take place at the Hollywood Bowl in Los Angeles.) | Inglewood | United States | Great Western Forum | 25,756 / 29,000 | $977,849 |
| August 1 | Concord | United States | Concord Pavilion | —N/a | —N/a |
| August 3 | San Diego | United States | San Diego Sports Arena | —N/a | —N/a |
| August 4 | Las Vegas | United States | MGM Grand Garden Arena | —N/a | —N/a |
| August 5 | San Bernardino | United States | Blockbuster Pavilion | —N/a | —N/a |
| August 6 | Wheatland | United States | Sacramento Valley Amphitheatre | —N/a | —N/a |
| August 8 | Mountain View | United States | Shoreline Amphitheatre | —N/a | —N/a |
| August 10 | Portland | United States | Rose Garden | —N/a | —N/a |
| August 11 | George | United States | The Gorge Amphitheatre | 20,000 / 20,000 | $814,630 |
| August 12 | Vancouver | Canada | General Motors Place | —N/a | —N/a |
| August 14 | Salt Lake City | United States | Delta Center | —N/a | —N/a |
| August 21 | Burgettstown | United States | Post-Gazette Pavilion | —N/a | —N/a |
| August 22 | Toronto | Canada | Molson Amphitheatre | —N/a | —N/a |
| August 23 | Montreal | Canada | Molson Centre | —N/a | —N/a |
| August 24 (Note: The August 24, 2000 concert at the Empire Expo Center in Syracuse was part of the Great New York State Fair.) | Syracuse | United States | Empire Expo Center | —N/a | —N/a |
| August 25 | Atlantic City | United States | Etess Arena | —N/a | —N/a |
| August 28 | Mansfield | United States | Tweeter Center | —N/a | —N/a |
| August 30 | Saratoga Springs | United States | Saratoga Performing Arts Center | —N/a | —N/a |
| August 31 | Cleveland | United States | Gund Arena | —N/a | —N/a |
| September 1 | Knoxville | United States | Thompson–Boling Arena | —N/a | —N/a |
| September 2 | Noblesville | United States | Deer Creek Music Center | —N/a | —N/a |
| September 3 | Columbus | United States | Polaris Amphitheater | —N/a | —N/a |
| September 9 | Orlando | United States | TD Waterhouse Centre | —N/a | —N/a |
| September 10 | West Palm Beach | United States | Coral Sky Amphitheatre | —N/a | —N/a |
| September 12 | Raleigh | United States | Alltel Pavilion | —N/a | —N/a |
| September 13 | Charlotte | United States | Blockbuster Pavilion | —N/a | —N/a |
| September 14 | Virginia Beach | United States | GTE Virginia Beach Amphitheater | —N/a | —N/a |
| September 15 | Burgettstown | United States | Post-Gazette Pavilion | —N/a | —N/a |
| September 16 | Nashville | United States | AmSouth Amphitheatre | —N/a | —N/a |
| September 18 | Atlanta | United States | Coca-Cola Lakewood Amphitheatre | 18,254 / 18,954 | $596,110 |
| September 20 | New Orleans | United States | Louisiana Superdome | —N/a | —N/a |
| October 10 | London | England | Wembley Arena | —N/a | —N/a |
| October 11 | London | England | Wembley Arena | —N/a | —N/a |
| October 12 | London | England | Wembley Arena | —N/a | —N/a |
| October 13 | Manchester | England | Manchester Evening News Arena | —N/a | —N/a |
| October 14 | Manchester | England | Manchester Evening News Arena | —N/a | —N/a |
| October 17 | Bremen | Germany | Stadthalle Bremen | —N/a | —N/a |
| October 18 | Ghent | Belgium | Flanders Expo | —N/a | —N/a |
| October 19 | Dortmund | Germany | Westfalenhallen | —N/a | —N/a |
| October 20 | Stuttgart | Germany | Hanns-Martin-Schleyer-Halle | —N/a | —N/a |
| October 22 | Barcelona | Spain | Palau Sant Jordi | 20,000 / 20,000 | —N/a |
| October 24 | Milan | Italy | FilaForum | —N/a | —N/a |
| October 25 | Zürich | Switzerland | Hallenstadion | —N/a | —N/a |
| October 26 | Munich | Germany | Olympiahalle | —N/a | —N/a |
| October 28 | Kiel | Germany | Ostseehalle | —N/a | —N/a |
| October 29 | Berlin | Germany | Velodrom | —N/a | —N/a |
| October 30 | Hanover | Germany | Preussag Arena | —N/a | —N/a |
| November 1 | Leipzig | Germany | Mesehalle | —N/a | —N/a |
| November 2 | Frankfurt | Germany | Festhalle Frankfurt | —N/a | —N/a |
| November 4 | Arnhem | Netherlands | GelreDome | —N/a | —N/a |
| November 7 | Gothenburg | Sweden | Scandinavium | —N/a | —N/a |
| November 8 | Oslo | Norway | Oslo Spektrum | —N/a | —N/a |
| November 9 | Stockholm | Sweden | Stockholm Globe Arena | —N/a | —N/a |
| November 10 | Copenhagen | Denmark | Valby-Hallen | —N/a | —N/a |
| November 13 | Cologne | Germany | Kölnarena | —N/a | —N/a |
| November 14 | Paris | France | Zénith de Paris | —N/a | —N/a |
| November 15 | London | England | London Arena | —N/a | —N/a |
| November 16 | London | England | London Arena | —N/a | —N/a |
| November 18 | Manchester | England | Manchester Evening News Arena | —N/a | —N/a |
| November 20 | Birmingham | England | NEC Arena | —N/a | —N/a |
| November 21 | Birmingham | England | NEC Arena | —N/a | —N/a |

List of 2001 concerts
| Date (2001) | City | Country | Venue | Attendance | Revenue |
|---|---|---|---|---|---|
| January 18 (Note: The January 18, 2001 concert at the City of Rock in Rio de Janeiro was part of the Rock in Rio.) | Rio de Janeiro | Brazil | City of Rock | —N/a | —N/a |
| Total | | | | 195,177 / 199,177 (98%) | $6,370,695 |

== Cancelled shows ==
List of cancelled concerts, showing date, city, country, and venue
| Date | City | Country | Venue | Reason |
|---|---|---|---|---|
| July 26, 2000 | Morrison | United States | Red Rocks Amphitheatre | Production difficulties |
