= Lucky (Britney Spears song) =

2000 single by Britney Spears

Single by Britney Spears

from the album Oops!... I Did It Again
- B-side: "Heart"
- Released: July 25, 2000
- Recorded: November 1999
- Studio: Cheiron (Stockholm)
- Genre: Bubblegum pop; teen pop
- Length: 3:24
- Label: Jive
- Songwriters: Max Martin; Rami Yacoub; Alexander Kronlund
- Producers: Max Martin; Rami Yacoub

Britney Spears singles chronology
"Oops!... I Did It Again" (2000)	"Lucky" (2000)	"Stronger" (2000)

Music video
- "Lucky" on YouTube

"Lucky" is a song by American singer Britney Spears from her second studio album, Oops!... I Did It Again (2000). It was released on July 25, 2000, by Jive Records as the second single from the album. After meeting with producers Max Martin and Rami Yacoub in Sweden, the singer recorded numerous songs for the album, including "Lucky". The song's narrative follows the story of the eponymous famous actress, who, despite seemingly having it all – celebrity, wealth, beauty – is truly lonely and ambivalent on the inside. It received critical acclaim, with critics praising its melody and rhythm, and Spears's vocals.

"Lucky" became a global success, topping the charts in Austria, Germany, Sweden and Switzerland, while reaching the top ten in several other regions. In the United Kingdom, the song peaked at number five, and is Spears's tenth best-selling single in the country, having sold over 225,000 copies. It also peaked at number 23 on the Billboard Hot 100 in the United States. An accompanying music video was directed by Dave Meyers, and portrays Spears as herself and a melancholy movie star Lucky, who just wants to have some fun in life. Spears has performed "Lucky" in a number of live appearances and in three of her concert tours. The tune inspired other musicians, such as Taylor Swift, Meghan Trainor, and Halsey, who sampled it in her own single "Lucky".

== Background and composition ==
"Lucky"
A 21-second sample of the song's chorus, which features Spears singing about a lonely pop star.

In 1999, Britney Spears began work on her second studio album Oops!... I Did It Again (2000), in Sweden and Switzerland. After meeting with Max Martin and Rami Yacoub in Sweden, Spears recorded several songs for the album, including "Lucky", which was co-written and co-produced by Martin and Rami, with additional co-writing from Alexander Kronlund. Upon returning to America, the singer revealed in an interview with MTV News that: "I just got back from Sweden, and did half [of] the material [for Oops!] over there. I was really, really happy with the material, but we had [such] limited time to get so much done. So I've just really been in the studio nonstop, which is cool, though." Spears recorded her vocals for the song, the first week of November 1999 at Cheiron Studios in Stockholm, Sweden. "Lucky" was released on August 8, 2000, as the second single from the album.

"Lucky" is a song that lasts for 3 minutes and 24 seconds. According to the digital music sheet published at Musicnotes.com, the song is composed in the key of D♭ major (but will later modulate to E♭ major at the end of the bridge) and is set in the time signature of common time with a moderate tempo of 95 beats per minute, while Spears's vocal range spans over an octave, from A♭_{3} to E♭_{5}. "Lucky" has a basic sequence of D♭–B♭m–G♭–A♭ as its chord progression. David Veitch of the Calgary Sun and Chuck Taylor of Billboard compared the song's rhythm to the ones of Spears's previous singles "...Baby One More Time" (1998) and "Sometimes" (1999). Lyrically, Spears tells "a story about a girl named Lucky," who is a famous pop star that, despite having all that she wants, still feels lonely inside. Veitch also commented that the lyrics actually refer to Spears' life.

== Critical response ==
"Lucky" received acclaim from music critics. A review by the NME staff explained that "Lucky" is "perhaps Britney's finest moment. The ultimate mallrat, bittersweet teenage symphony". They considered the song Spears' version of "Where Did It All Go Wrong?" by English rock band Oasis, and went to describe it as "a heart-rending tale of life at the top of the teen pop tree, transformed into an anthem for dramatic, moody 12-year-old girls everywhere by Max Martin's scary talent for teenybop lyrics". However, it was noted that some of the lyrics "sounds pretty heavy when you've just been dumped and Britney's Mickey Mouse Club-trained falsetto is reaching its peak". David Veitch of Calgary Sun called "Lucky" a "sweetly melodic mid-tempo song" and regarding the lyrics commented, "We feel her pain", Billboard magazine contributor Chuck Taylor praised "Lucky" and featured the song on the Spolight column of his Singles Review section. Taylor said that: "its contagious melody, bang-in-your-brain hook, the empathetic theme of a girl who's the world biggest superstar and yet feels all alone (hmm...) will make it an easy sell to top 40 radio and to her grand legion of dedicated fans".

Rolling Stone called it "one of her most bubbly tunes, but the lyrics about a miserable starlet suggest that she identified with the dark side of fame very early on in her career". Gay Times' Daniel Megarry felt that "the bittersweet 'Lucky', which almost feels autobiographical, remains the ultimate throwback for 90s kids". The staff from Entertainment Weekly placed it at number 10 on their ranking of Spears's songs and said that "given everything we know about Spears’ past decade, it's hard not to hear 'Lucky' as a haunting premonition packaged in fairy dust". Erin Strecker, from Billboard, called it "one of the pop princess' great ballads", and "undoubtedly one of the high points of Britney Spears' career". Writing for Pink News, Mayer Nissim called it a "a ‘60s-infused self-reflective bit of pop", but pointed out that "there’s a real sense of genuine emotion Spears gets across with some neat vocal flourishes". For Christopher Rosa from Glamour, it's Spears's fifth best song, as well as a "perfect blend of the sweet-pop sound from her first record and lyrics that feel just a little more grown-up". Bustle's Alex Kristelis explained that the song's "bubblegum pop gloss disguises even its most devastating lyrics".

== Chart performance ==
In the United States, "Lucky" peaked at number 23 on the Billboard Hot 100 and number nine on the Top 40 Mainstream chart. It also peaked at number 39 on the Hot Dance Music/Maxi-Singles Sales component chart, and number 14 on Rhythmic Top 40. In October 2023, the song was certified platinum by the Recording Industry Association of America (RIAA), for surpassing one million units sold.

"Lucky" also achieved commercial success worldwide, reaching number one in Austria, Europe, Sweden and Switzerland, while reaching the top ten in several European countries. On the week of August 28, 2000, "Lucky" debuted at number five on the UK Singles Chart, falling to number six in the following week. According to the Official Charts Company, it is her tenth best-selling single in the country, having sold over 225,000 copies there. As of June 2024, "Lucky" was certified gold in the United Kingdom, for exceeding 400,000 units sold. In Australia, the song peaked at number three, and was later certified platinum by the Australian Recording Industry Association (ARIA), for shipments of more than 70,000 units of the single. In Germany, the song reached number one on the Media Control Charts, being certified gold by the Bundesverband Musikindustrie (BVMI) for shipping over 250,000 units of the single.

== Music video ==
Jive Records commissioned a music video for "Lucky" to be directed by Dave Meyers. It was shot on June 12 and 13, 2000, at the Ren-Mar Studios in Hollywood, California, and premiered on July 13, 2000. According to Jocelyn Vena of MTV, Spears portrays "a melancholy movie star who wants nothing more than to have a little fun".

Spears portraying melancholic movie star Lucky, as she wins her Academy Award for Best Actress

The video begins with Spears telling a story about a very famous Hollywood actress named Lucky, played by Spears herself. Lucky is seen wearing a pink nightgown behind the curtains, standing on her billboard with fluffy white cotton balls attached to the edges, inside her mansion and shots of her out on the balcony. As beautiful and rich as she is, on set she sits on the star-shape in the sky, as she is acting, she is looking quite distressed. After the first chorus, she goes to the hotel mansion to the flowers, then she leaves and sits down and gets a mirror. Next, Lucky opens the door to reveal a handsome man, who then takes her in his arms, as the director yells "Cut! We've got it". Lucky then walks off-set into the studio, replying to the director: "Finally! We've done it fifty million times!" She then goes to have her hair and makeup done; with Spears standing unnoticed and very worried looking by her side. Lucky is then seen in a shiny silver evening gown at the Oscars accepting her Academy Award for Best Actress. Lucky looks happy as she accepts it and smiles at her fans but is soon revealed that this is not true happiness. She makes her way away from her screaming fans and back into her limo, where she unexpectedly finds an ornate hand mirror that was used on the film set. She looks back to the crowd to see who has left it and sees Spears leaning forward in the crowd. The limo drives away, leaving Spears behind on the red carpet. The video ends with Lucky crying herself to sleep, her makeup already stained on her face. The curtains close, ending the video.

Scenes of the video are interspersed with Spears singing the song from a billboard and sitting in the middle of a giant star centerpiece, sprinkling glitter down on Lucky.

A Billboard staff reviewer noted that the story "turned out to be less than pure fiction when the singer later went through personal problems in the very public eye." A writer of Rolling Stone explained that "Lucky" is best known for "being the first Spears video to focus on what would become a recurring theme: her conflicted relationship to fame".

== Live performances ==
Spears performed "Lucky" for the first time on the opening date of her Oops!... I Did It Again Tour, in Columbia, Maryland, on June 20, 2000. The performance of the song featured a Navy theme. The track was also on the Dream Within a Dream Tour (2001–02), where Spears emerged from the middle of a giant music box on the stage as a ballerina, to perform the song in a medley with "Born to Make You Happy" and "Sometimes", right after the performance of "Overprotected". Spears also performed the song on several television appearances, including Top of the Pops Germany in 2000, and NBC's Today. "Lucky" was included on the setlist of the Britney: Piece of Me, Spears' Las Vegas residency show (2013–16).

== Legacy ==
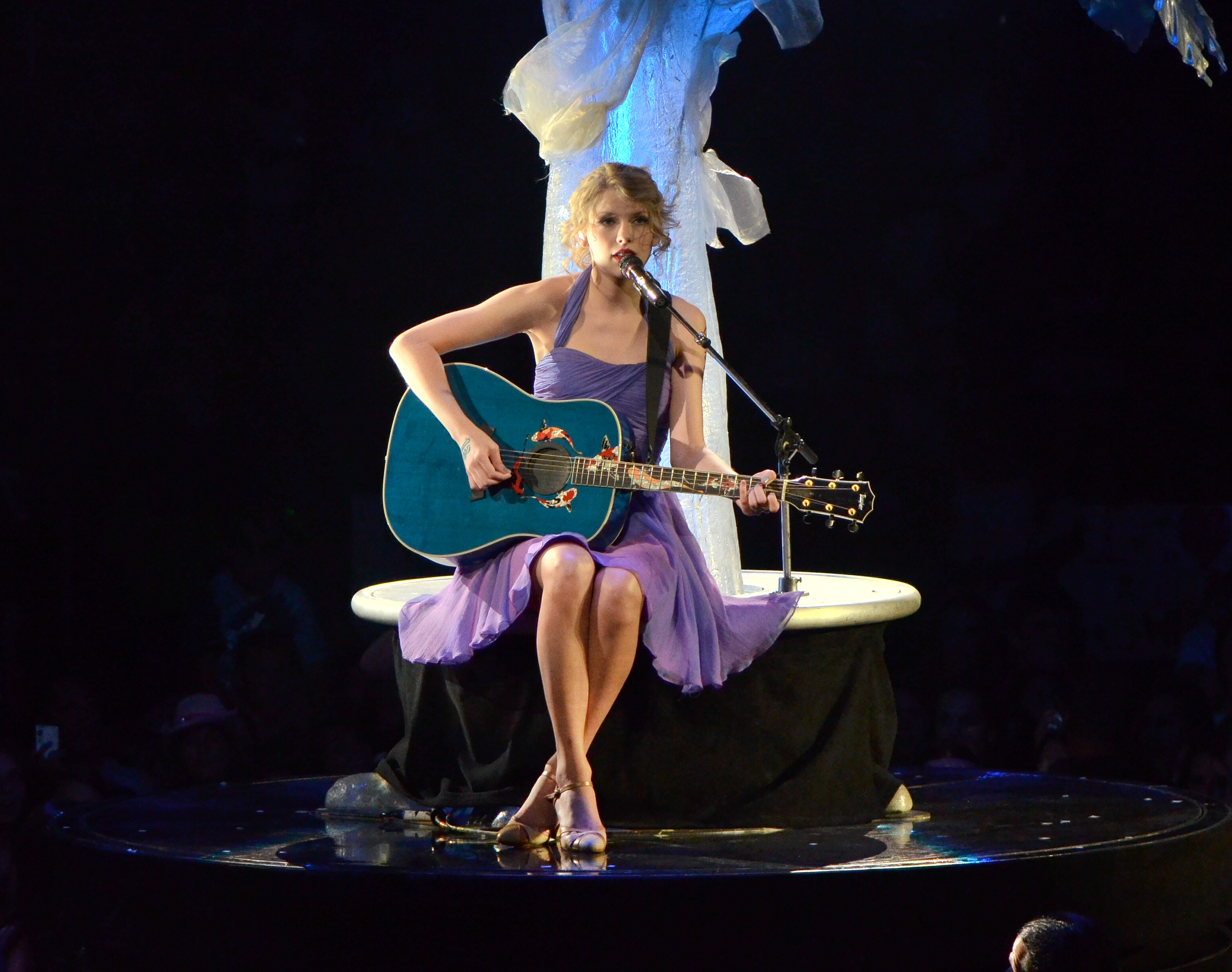
Taylor Swift covered "Lucky" during her Speak Now World Tour, 2011.

American singer-songwriter Taylor Swift performed the song on her Speak Now World Tour on September 20, 2011, located in Louisiana, as a tribute to Spears. In 2018, for her song "Delicate", Billboard drew parallels between the songs writing: "The clip features the singer in several situations – in an interview on a red carpet, surrounded by fans, flanked by bodyguards, and alone in a hotel room making funny faces – clearly disturbed by her fame, calling back to Britney Spears' 'Lucky.'" Swift also references the song in her track from her 2012 album Red, "The Lucky One".

In 2016, Meghan Trainor shared that the song was an inspiration for her own song, "Mom", saying: "You know the Britney Spears song, 'Lucky'? Where it's like, a big bomb and then it has the, 'And here she is, it's Lucky!' I was like, 'I want one of those,'" she says. "So we called [my mom] up at work and I was just like, 'I love you, I love you so much. Just tell me you love me' and we recorded it and got it." She also included the song in her "Playlist of My Life " video, by Teen Vogue. Chloë Grace Moretz also included the song, saying she has found her womanhood through Spears' music. In 2021, Courtney Love covered the song as part of her ongoing covers series.

In 2024, American singer Halsey shared a snippet of her single "Lucky" from her album The Great Impersonator and revealed that it samples Britney Spears's single. She revealed that she got Spears' "blessing" to interpolate her 2000 single of the same name. The same year, Jade Thirlwall from Little Mix said that "Lucky" was an inspiration for her debut single "Angel of My Dreams", adding "I am obsessed with pop and looking at all the pop girlies that I love, they are the ones doing the absolute most. Like the looks, the choreo, the big songs, big choruses.. ..that is what I want to deliver."

== Track listings ==
- European CD single
1. "Lucky" (Album Version) – 3:24
2. "Heart" – 3:00
- European CD maxi single
1. "Lucky" (Album Version) – 3:24
2. "Heart" – 3:00
3. "Lucky" (Jack D. Elliot Radio Mix) – 3:26
- Australian CD maxi single (Part 1)
1. "Lucky" (Album Version) – 3:24
2. "Heart" – 3:00
3. "Lucky" (Jack D. Elliot Radio Mix) – 3:26
4. "Oops!... I Did It Again" (Jack D. Elliot Club Mix) – 6:24
- Australian CD maxi single (Part 2)
1. "Lucky" (Album Version) – 3:24
2. "Oops!... I Did It Again" (Rodney Jerkins Remix) – 3:07
3. "Oops!... I Did It Again" (Ospina's Crossover Mix) – 3:15
4. "Lucky" (Jason Nevins Mixshow Edit) – 5:51
5. "Lucky" (Riprock and Alex G. Radio Edit) – 3:58
6. "Oops!... I Did It Again" (Enhanced Video) – 4:12
- Japanese CD maxi single
1. "Lucky" (Album Version) – 3:24
2. "Lucky" (Jack D. Elliot Radio Mix) – 3:26
3. "Oops!... I Did It Again" (Ospina's Crossover Mix) – 3:15
4. "Oops!... I Did It Again" (Riprock 'n' Alex G. Oops! We Remixed Again! Radio Mix) – 3:54
- Australian cassette single
1. "Lucky" (Album Version) – 3:24
2. "Lucky" (Jack D. Elliot Radio Mix) – 3:26
3. "Oops!... I Did It Again" (Jack D. Elliot Club Mix) – 6:24
- European cassette single
1. "Lucky" (Album Version) – 3:24
2. "Heart" – 3:00
3. "Oops!... I Did It Again" (Jack D. Elliot Club Mix) – 6:24
- 12-inch vinyl
1. "Lucky" (Jack D. Elliot Club Mix) – 6:42
2. "Lucky" (Album Version) – 3:25
3. "Lucky" (Jack D. Elliot Radio Mix) – 3:27
4. "Lucky" (Riprock 'n' Alex G. Extended Club Mix) – 7:16
5. "Lucky" (Jason Nevins Mixshow Edit) – 5:51
- 2025 Digital Single
1. "Lucky" (Album Version) – 3:26
2. "Lucky" (Jack D. Elliot Club Mix) – 6:44
3. "Lucky" (Jack D. Elliot Radio Mix) – 3:27
4. "Lucky" (Riprock 'n' Alex G. Extended Club Mix) – 7:18
5. "Lucky" (Riprock 'n' Alex G. Radio Mix) – 4:00
6. "Lucky" (Jason Nevins Mixshow Edit) – 5:53
7. "Lucky" (Instrumental) – 3:24

== Credits and personnel ==
- Britney Spears – lead vocals
- Max Martin – production, songwriting, audio mixing, keyboards, programming, background vocals
- Rami Yacoub – production, songwriting, keyboards
- Nana Hedin – background vocals
- Alexander Kronlund – songwriting
- Esbjörn Öhrwall – guitar
- Tom Coyne – audio mastering

== Charts ==
=== Weekly charts ===
Weekly chart performance for "Lucky"
Chart (2000)	Peak position
Australia (ARIA)	3
Austria (Ö3 Austria Top 40)	1
Belgium (Ultratop 50 Flanders)	9
Belgium (Ultratop 50 Wallonia)	10
Canada Top Singles (RPM)	2
Canada Adult Contemporary (RPM)	49
Canada Dance/Urban (RPM)	39
Chile (EFE)	3
Croatia International Airplay (HRT)	1
Czech Republic (Rádio – Top 100)	1
Denmark (Billboard)	8
El Salvador (EFE)	1
Europe (Eurochart Hot 100)	1
Europe (European Radio Top 50)	2
Finland (Suomen virallinen lista)	15
France (SNEP)	16
Germany (GfK)	1
Guatemala (EFE)	1
Honduras (EFE)	10
Hungary (MAHASZ)	9
Hungary Airplay (Music & Media)	1
Iceland (Íslenski Listinn Topp 40)	3
Ireland (IRMA)	2
Italy (FIMI)	8
Netherlands (Dutch Top 40)	4
Netherlands (Single Top 100)	4
New Zealand (Recorded Music NZ)	4
Norway (VG-lista)	5
Poland (Polish Airplay Charts)	2
Portugal (AFP)	6
Romania (Romanian Top 100)	3
Scottish Singles Sales (Official Charts)	5
Singapore (SPVA)	4
Spain (Promusicae)	12
Sweden (Sverigetopplistan)	1
Switzerland (Schweizer Hitparade)	1
UK Singles (Official Charts)	5
UK Independent (Official Charts)	1
US Billboard Hot 100	23
US Pop Airplay (Billboard)	9
US Rhythmic Airplay (Billboard)	14
Venezuela (EFE)	8

Weekly chart performance
Chart (2012)	Peak position
South Korea International (Circle)	90

=== Year-end charts ===
Year-end chart performance for "Lucky"
Chart (2000)	Position
Australia (ARIA)	29
Austria (Ö3 Austria Top 40)	9
Belgium (Ultratop 50 Flanders)	49
Belgium (Ultratop 50 Wallonia)	55
Denmark (IFPI)	44
Europe (Eurochart Hot 100)	23
Europe (European Radio Top 100)	21
France (SNEP)	100
Germany (Media Control)	10
Iceland (Íslenski Listinn Topp 40)	34
Ireland (IRMA)	29
Netherlands (Dutch Top 40)	67
Netherlands (Single Top 100)	41
New Zealand (RIANZ)	35
Romania (Romanian Top 100)	13
Sweden (Hitlistan)	8
Switzerland (Schweizer Hitparade)	25
UK Singles (OCC)	63
US Mainstream Top 40 (Billboard)	62
US Rhythmic Top 40 (Billboard)	75

== Certifications and sales ==
Certifications and sales for "Lucky"
Region	Certification	Certified units/sales
Australia (ARIA)	Platinum	70,000^{^}
Austria (IFPI Austria)	Gold	25,000^{*}
Belgium (BRMA)	Gold	25,000^{*}
Canada (Music Canada)	Gold	40,000^{‡}
Denmark	—	3,896
France	—	64,209
Germany (BVMI)	Gold	250,000^{^}
New Zealand (RMNZ) Physical sales	Platinum	10,000^{*}
New Zealand (RMNZ) Digital sales + streaming	Gold	15,000^{‡}
Sweden (GLF)	Platinum	30,000^{^}
United Kingdom (BPI)	Gold	400,000^{‡}
United States (RIAA)	Platinum	1,000,000^{‡}
^{*} Sales figures based on certification alone.^{^} Shipments figures based on certification alone.^{‡} Sales+streaming figures based on certification alone.

== Release history ==
Release dates and formats for "Lucky"
Region	Date	Format(s)	Label(s)	Ref.
United States	July 25, 2000	Contemporary hit radio	Jive	
Australia	August 1, 2000	Maxi CD (Note: In Australia, "Lucky" was made available in two maxi CD variants.)	Zomba	
France	August 1, 2000	Maxi CD	Jive	
Germany	August 8, 2000	Maxi CD	Rough Trade	
United Kingdom	August 14, 2000	Cassette; CD	Jive	
United States	August 14, 2000	Adult contemporary radio; hot adult contemporary radio	Jive	
United Kingdom	August 21, 2000	Maxi CD	Jive	
France	August 29, 2000	CD	Jive	
Japan	September 6, 2000	Maxi CD	Avex Trax	
