= (You Drive Me) Crazy =

1999 single by Britney Spears

Single by Britney Spears

from the album ...Baby One More Time
- B-side: "I'll Never Stop Loving You"
- Released: August 24, 1999
- Recorded: May 1998 (album version); May 1999 (The Stop Remix!)
- Studio: Cheiron Studios (Stockholm, Sweden)
- Genre: Dance-pop; teen pop; bubblegum pop
- Length: 3:16
- Label: Jive
- Songwriters: Jörgen Elofsson; Per Magnusson; David Kreuger; Max Martin
- Producers: David Kreuger; Per Magnusson; Max Martin; Rami

Britney Spears singles chronology
"Sometimes" (1999)	"(You Drive Me) Crazy" (1999)	"Born to Make You Happy" (1999)

Music video
- "(You Drive Me) Crazy" on YouTube

"(You Drive Me) Crazy" is a song by American singer Britney Spears from her debut studio album, ...Baby One More Time (1999). Written and produced by Max Martin, Per Magnusson and David Kreuger with additional writing by Jörgen Elofsson and remix by Martin and Rami Yacoub, it was released as the album's third single on August 24, 1999, by Jive Records. It was featured on the soundtrack of the 1999 teen romantic comedy film Drive Me Crazy. The song garnered positive reviews from music critics, some of whom praised its simple formula and noted similarities to Spears's debut single, "...Baby One More Time".

"(You Drive Me) Crazy" was a commercial success and peaked inside the top ten on the singles charts of seventeen countries. In the United Kingdom, it became Spears's third consecutive single to peak inside the top five, while it reached number ten in the United States's Billboard Hot 100 and peaked at number one in Belgium (Wallonia) and Iceland. An accompanying music video, directed by Nigel Dick, portrays Spears as a waitress of a dance club and she performs a highly choreographed dance routine with the other waitresses. The video premiered on an episode MTV's Making the Video. It features cameo appearances by actors Melissa Joan Hart and Adrian Grenier, who star in the movie Drive Me Crazy, which is named for the song. As part of promotion for the song, Spears performed the song at the 1999 MTV Europe Music Awards and 1999 Billboard Music Awards. It has also been included on five of her concert tours.

== Background and release ==
Before recording her debut album ...Baby One More Time, Britney Spears had originally envisioned it in style of "Sheryl Crow music, but younger [and] more adult contemporary". However, the singer agreed with her label's appointment of producers, who had the objective to target a teenage audience at the time. She flew to Cheiron Studios in Stockholm, Sweden, where half of the album was recorded in May 1998, with producers Max Martin, Denniz Pop and Rami Yacoub, among others.

"(You Drive Me) Crazy" was written by Jörgen Elofsson, while song production and additional songwriting was done by Martin, Per Magnusson and David Kreuger. Spears recorded the vocals for the song in March 1998, at Cheiron Studios in Stockholm, Sweden. It was also mixed at Cheiron Studios by Martin. Esbjörn Öhrwall and Johan Carlberg played the guitar, while bass guitar was done by Thomas Lindberg. Keyboards and programming was done by Kreuger, and additional keyboards by Magnusson. Background vocals were provided by Jeanette Söderholm, Martin, Yacoub and THE FANCHOIR, formed by Chatrin Nyström, Jeanette Stenhammar, Johanna Stenhammar, Charlotte Björkman and Therese Ancker.

In May 1999, Martin and Spears went to the Battery Studios in New York City, New York, to re-record the vocals of the track, due to the fact that a remixed version called "The Stop Remix!" (named for a part in which Spears shouts "Stop!") was going to be included on the original motion picture soundtrack of the film Drive Me Crazy (1999). "(You Drive Me) Crazy" was released as a remix package as the third single from ...Baby One More Time on August 23, 1999.

== Composition ==
"(You Drive Me) Crazy"
A 20-second sample of the R&B tinged chorus.

"(You Drive Me) Crazy" is a pop song. The song's composition follows a simple formula and infuses drums, guitar, and edgy synthesized instruments, including a recurring cowbell, and having a roughly similar sound to Spears's debut single "...Baby One More Time" (1999). According to the sheet music published at Musicnotes.com by Universal Music Publishing Group, "(You Drive Me) Crazy" is composed in the key of C minor and runs through a moderately slow dance beat infused metronome of 101 beats per minute. Spears's vocals were deemed as heavily processed when compared to the ones of her previous single, "Sometimes". Her vocal range spans over an octave, from the low-key of G3 to the high-note of D♭5. The song's primary chord progression is Cm–A♭-G (i-bVI-V), with a few deviations.

== Critical reception ==
The song garnered positive reviews from music critics. Kyle Anderson for MTV considered "(You Drive Me) Crazy" as "a similar-sounding anthem [to '...Baby One More Time'] with some streamlined rock guitar taking center stage (there's even a solo). It's catchy enough". Spence D. of IGN considered "(You Drive Me) Crazy" a "[Max] Martin's glossy grown-up pop" song, while Caryn Ganz of Rolling Stone called "(You Drive Me) Crazy" a "further hit" from ...Baby One More Time, along with "From the Bottom of My Broken Heart" and "Sometimes". Music critic Walt Mueller wrote "When Spears starts to sing on this one, she sounds a lot like Janet Jackson". Christy Lemire of the Associated Press noted that the song and "Stronger" are "so lamely feel-good" tracks that they "could have been the theme song to a Karate Kid sequel". Evan Sawdey of PopMatters called it a "lightly dorky" song, and Stephen Thomas Erlewine of AllMusic deemed it as a "fluffy dance-pop at its best". In a list compiled by Sara Anderson of AOL Radio, "(You Drive Me) Crazy" was ranked ninth in a list of Spears's best songs. During the 2001 BMI Pop Awards, "(You Drive Me) Crazy" was honored with the award of Most Performed BMI Song.

While reviewing ...Baby One More Time on its 20th anniversary, Billboard's Chuck Arnold felt that "sparkling with the Midas touch of Max Martin, 'Crazy' perfectly captures the crazy giddiness of young love -- the kind that keeps you up all night". The staff from Entertainment Weekly placed it at number 22 on their ranking of Spears's songs and wrote: "highlighted by her overpronunciation of "you", bell rings, and a backup choir that turns the chorus into a massive singalong. ['(You Drive Me) Crazy'] captures Spears at full force, with a robust vocal performance and an ab-emphasizing choreographed dance, remembered best through its music video". Bustle's Alex Kritelis Reilly preferred the Stop remix over the original album version. Nayer Nissim, from Pink News, deemed it "another perfect bit of late '90s pop. Very nearly as catchy as her debut". Shannon Barbour from Cosmopolitan opined that it was "not her best song, but it's insanely addictive". Nicholas Hautman, from Us Weekly, deemed it the singer's ninth greatest single and said: "This quasi-dorky dance track can be easily summed up using just three words: pure ear candy". For Digital Spy's Alim Kheraj, the most notable thing was the song's prominent use of cowbells; "backed up by rock guitars and flawless Max Martin production, Britney sounds confident, her vocals clear and powerful". In 2019, the staff of Billboard ranked the "Stop Remix!" as the 39th greatest song of 1999; Nolan Feeney said that although it was "hardly unrecognizable", Spears's re-recorded vocals, the song's new intro and "her headline 'Stop!' interjection in the reimagined bridge made it something truly worth losing your mind over".

== Chart performance ==
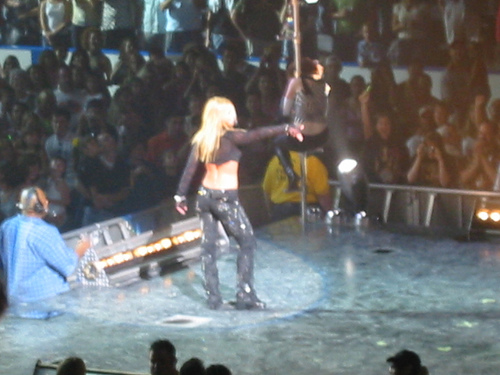
Spears performing "(You Drive Me) Crazy" during the Dream Within a Dream Tour, 2001

"(You Drive Me) Crazy" was a commercial success. The song peaked at number two on the European Hot 100 Singles, being held off the top spot by R. Kelly's "If I Could Turn Back the Hands of Time". In the United Kingdom, it was Spears' third consecutive single to reach a top five position. The track debuted and peaked at number five on the chart issue dated October 2, 1999, and stayed on the chart for a total of eleven weeks. It was eventually certified gold by the British Phonographic Industry (BPI), for sales and streams of over 400,000 units. According to the Official Charts Company, "(You Drive Me) Crazy" is Spears' seventh best-selling single in the United Kingdom, with sales over 275,000 physical units. The song peaked at number two in France and number four in Germany, being certified gold in both countries for shipping over 250,000 units. It also peaked at number one in Belgium (Wallonia), finishing the year of 1999 as the 17th best-selling single. "(You Drive Me) Crazy" was also able to peak inside the top five in Belgium (Flanders), Finland, Ireland, Netherlands, Norway, Sweden, and Switzerland, while reaching top ten positions in Denmark and Italy. Later in 2012, the song managed to peak at number 65 in Czech Republic due to high airplay.

In the United States, "(You Drive Me) Crazy" peaked at number ten on Billboard Hot 100 on the chart issue dated November 13, 1999, and became Spears' second single to peak inside the top ten in the country. On the same week, it peaked at number four on the Pop Songs component chart. On the chart compiled by RPM magazine, the song peaked at number three in Canada. However, on the Canadian Singles Chart compiled by Nielsen Soundscan, it peaked at number 13. The latter revealed that "(You Drive Me) Crazy" was the 44th best-selling single of 1999 in the country. The track peaked at number five in New Zealand, but failed to reach the top ten in Australia, where it peaked at number 12 on the chart issue dated November 12, 1999. However, the single was later certified platinum by the Australian Recording Industry Association (ARIA), and was one of the best-selling singles of 2000 in the country. "(You Drive Me) Crazy" performed poorly in Japan, where it peaked at number 80, and stayed on the chart for two weeks only. Despite the low sales, it is Spears' 12th best-selling CD release in the country.

== Music video ==
Spears dressed as a dance club waitress in the music video for "(You Drive Me) Crazy"

The song's accompanying music video (which uses The Stop Remix!) was directed by Nigel Dick and filmed on June 14 and 15, 1999 at the AES Power Station in Redondo Beach, California. Spears conceptualized the video's treatment, and explained during an interview with MTV in 1999 that "it would be cool to be in a club, and we're dorky waitresses, and we break out and start dancing." At the time, Spears expected that the video would take her "to the next level". To promote the film Drive Me Crazy, actors Adrian Grenier and Melissa Joan Hart were invited to make cameo appearances in the video, since the song had been included on the film's soundtrack, however, Grenier did not want to participate. Dick commented on the issue, saying, "I was given instructions to ring him up and make sure he appeared in the video. I said, 'You know what, Adrian, I just think it would be great for your career, and Britney's a great girl and she's fun to work with.' Eventually he came around." Dick also revealed that he was impressed by the singer's work ethic, adding that she "came to the set completely rehearsed." The music video world-premiered on July 5, 1999 on MTV's Making the Video. Due to Hart's appearance in the music video, parts of it were featured in the credits of "No Place Like Home", the season 4 premiere of Sabrina the Teenage Witch, an episode that guest starred Spears.

The video opens with Spears as a waitress of a dance club. She then goes with other waitresses to their dressing room, where they finish their makeup and change costumes. Spears, now wearing a sexy, green sequined outfit, goes through the corridor to the dance floor with her friends, and starts to perform a high-profile choreography, including a chair dance sequence referencing Janet Jackson's "Miss You Much" video, which Spears also referenced in live performances of the song on the Crazy 2k Tour. Scenes of Spears singing in front of a shining orange sign with the word "CRAZY" are also seen throughout the video. On August 24, 1999, the music video debuted at number four on Total Request Live. It is the longest running by a female artist on TRL, staying on the top ten for seventy-three days. The video was nominated on the category of Best Dance Video on the 2000 MTV Video Music Awards; it lost, however, to Jennifer Lopez's "Waiting for Tonight" (1999). Alternate footage of the video can be found on the DVD of Spears' first compilation album Greatest Hits: My Prerogative (2004). Jennifer Vineyard of MTV commented, "the alternate audio gives the feel of Spears singing the song as a round, where the beat is in sync but one layer of her vocals is just slightly ahead of the other." The music video for "(You Drive Me) Crazy" was re-created by Australian actress Rebel Wilson, in one of the scenes in the Netflix film Senior Year (2022).

== Live performances and covers ==
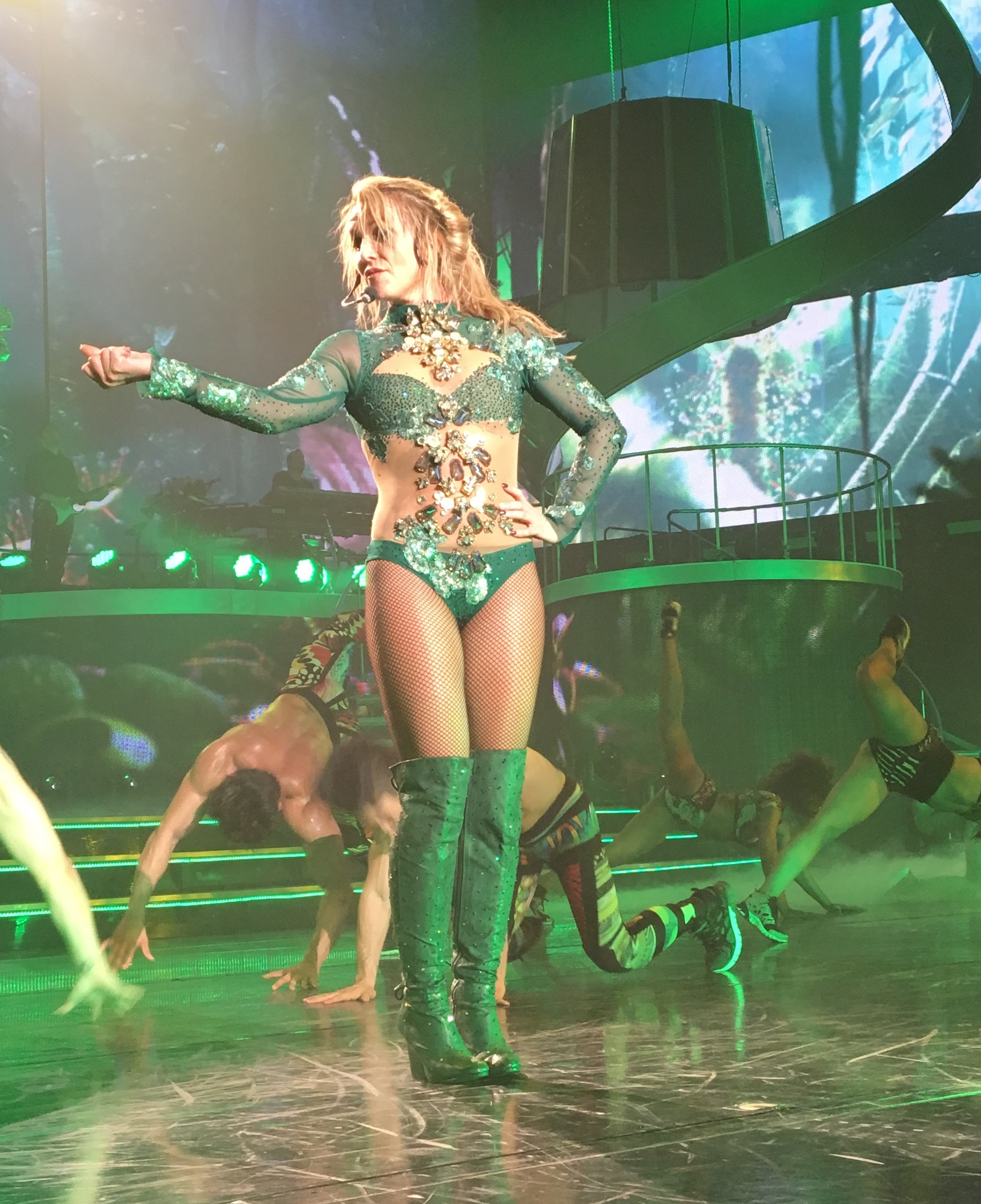
Spears performing "(You Drive Me) Crazy" at her Las Vegas residency show, Britney: Piece of Me, in February 2016

Spears performed the song for the very first time at her L'Oreal Hair Zone Mall Tour in New York City, USA on July 1, 1998. As part of promotion for "(You Drive Me) Crazy"'s release as a single, Spears performed it at the 1999 MTV Europe Music Awards and at the 1999 Billboard Music Awards. It was also performed on five concert tours, the first being the ...Baby One More Time Tour (1999). The show began with a dance introduction by Spears' dancers among smoke effects. She appeared shortly after at the top of the staircase wearing a hot pink vinyl tube top and white vinyl pants with pink knee patches. During the 2000 leg of the tour, entitled Crazy 2k Tour, Spears changed the opening sequence of the show; the show started with a skit in which the dancers came out of lockers and stayed in the stage until a bell rang. They all sat until a female teacher voice started calling their names. After the teacher called Spears, she emerged at the top of the staircase in a cloud of smoke, wearing a top and white stretch pants, to perform a short dance mix of "...Baby One More Time". She then entered one of the lockers and appeared in another one on the opposite side of the stage to perform "(You Drive Me) Crazy", which included a chair dance sequence referencing Janet Jackson's "Miss You Much" music video that ended with Spears saying "Is that the end?", quoting Jackson's phrase from the video. The song was once again performed in a dance-oriented form on the Oops!... I Did It Again Tour (2000–2001), while on the Dream Within a Dream Tour (2001–2002), the performance featured Spears being captured by her dancers. "(You Drive Me) Crazy" was also performed on The Onyx Hotel Tour (2004). For the tour, the song was remixed with elements of latin percussion. "Crazy" would not be performed by Spears for another nine years until it was included on the setlist of her Las Vegas residency show, Britney: Piece of Me (2013–2017).

In 2002, British nu metal band SugarComa covered "(You Drive Me) Crazy" and included it on their album Becoming Something Else. American musician Richard Cheese also covered the song in 2003 and included it on his album Tuxicity. American pop band Selena Gomez & the Scene performed a homage to Spears during their 2011 We Own the Night Tour. They performed "(You Drive Me) Crazy" along with a medley of hits that included "...Baby One More Time", "Oops!... I Did It Again", "I'm a Slave 4 U", "Toxic" and "Hold It Against Me", mixed similar to the Chris Cox Megamix included in Greatest Hits: My Prerogative. In the 2012 Glee season 4 episode "Britney 2.0", the characters of Marley Rose (Melissa Benoist) and Jake Puckerman (Jacob Artist) performed a medley of the track with Aerosmith's "Crazy" (1993). Argentine singer Lali Espósito samples the word "stop!" from the Stop Remix! on her 2023 single "Obsessión" from her album Lali.

== Track listings ==
- European CD single
1. "(You Drive Me) Crazy" (The Stop Remix!) – 3:16
2. "(You Drive Me) Crazy" (The Stop Remix! instrumental) – 3:16
- Australian and European CD maxi single
1. "(You Drive Me) Crazy" (The Stop Remix!) – 3:16
2. "(You Drive Me) Crazy" (The Stop Remix! instrumental) – 3:16
3. "I'll Never Stop Loving You" – 3:41
- Japanese CD maxi single
1. "(You Drive Me) Crazy" (The Stop Remix!) – 3:20
2. "I'll Never Stop Loving You" – 3:44
3. "...Baby One More Time" (Davidson Ospina Chronicles dub) – 6:34
4. "Sometimes" (Soul Solution drum dub) – 3:32
5. "(You Drive Me) Crazy" (The Stop Remix! instrumental) – 3:19
6. "Sometimes" (Thunderpuss 2000 mix) – 8:03
- UK CD maxi single
1. "(You Drive Me) Crazy" (The Stop Remix!) – 3:16
2. "(You Drive Me) Crazy" (Spacedust dark dub) – 9:15
3. "(You Drive Me) Crazy" (Spacedust club mix) – 7:20
- Cassette single
1. "(You Drive Me) Crazy" (The Stop Remix!) – 3:16
2. "I'll Never Stop Loving You" – 3:41
- 12" vinyl
1. "(You Drive Me) Crazy" (The Stop Remix!) – 3:16
2. "(You Drive Me) Crazy" (Jazzy Jim's hip-hop mix) – 3:40
3. "(You Drive Me) Crazy" (LP version) – 3:17
4. "(You Drive Me) Crazy" (Pimp Juice's Souled Out 4 Tha Suits vocal mix) – 6:30
5. "(You Drive Me) Crazy" (Mike Ski dub) – 8:26

== Credits and personnel ==
Credits for "(You Drive Me) Crazy" are taken from the single's liner notes.

=== Technical ===
- Recorded and mixed at Cheiron Studios in Stockholm, Sweden.
- Additional recording at Battery Studios in New York City, New York.

=== Personnel ===
- Britney Spears – lead vocals
- Jörgen Elofsson – songwriting
- David Kreuger – producer, keyboards, programming
- Per Magnusson – producer, keyboards
- Jeanette Söderholm – background vocals
- Esbjörn Öhrwall – guitar
- Johan Carlberg – guitar
- Thomas Lindberg – bass guitar
- Max Martin – mixing, background vocals, producer
- Rami Yacoub – background vocals
- The Fanchoir – background vocals
- Tom Coyne – audio mastering

== Charts ==
=== Weekly charts ===
1999–2000 weekly chart performance
Chart (1999–2000)	Peak position
Australia (ARIA)	12
Austria (Ö3 Austria Top 40)	10
Belgium (Ultratop 50 Flanders)	3
Belgium (Ultratop 50 Wallonia)	1
Canada Top Singles (RPM)	3
Canada Adult Contemporary (RPM)	20
Canada Dance/Urban (RPM)	12
Canada CHR (Nielsen BDS)	2
Croatia International Airplay (HRT)	1
Denmark (Tracklisten)	9
El Salvador (Notimex)	3
Europe (Eurochart Hot 100)	2
Finland (Suomen virallinen lista)	3
France (SNEP)	2
Germany (GfK)	4
Guatemala (Notimex)	1
Hungary (Mahasz)	2
Iceland (Íslenski Listinn Topp 40)	1
Ireland (IRMA)	3
Italy (Musica e dischi)	7
Japan International (Oricon)	1
Netherlands (Dutch Top 40)	2
Netherlands (Single Top 100)	2
New Zealand (Recorded Music NZ)	5
Nicaragua (Notimex)	5
Norway (VG-lista)	2
Scottish Singles Sales (Official Charts)	6
Spain (Promusicae)	14
Sweden (Sverigetopplistan)	2
Switzerland (Schweizer Hitparade)	4
UK Singles (Official Charts)	5
UK Airplay (Music Week)	11
UK Independent (Official Charts)	2
US Billboard Hot 100	10
US Dance Singles Sales (Billboard)	24
US Pop Airplay (Billboard)	4
US Rhythmic Airplay (Billboard)	9

2012 weekly chart performance
Chart (2012)	Peak position
Czech Republic Airplay (ČNS IFPI)	65

=== Year-end charts ===
Year-end chart performance
Chart (1999)	Position
Australia (ARIA)	41
Belgium (Ultratop 50 Flanders)	27
Belgium (Ultratop 50 Wallonia)	17
Canada Top Singles (RPM)	44
Europe (Eurochart Hot 100)	10
Europe (European Radio Top 100)	45
France (SNEP)	46
Germany (Media Control)	43
Netherlands (Dutch Top 40)	30
Netherlands (Single Top 100)	38
New Zealand (RIANZ)	21
Romania (Romanian Top 100)	51
Sweden (Hitlistan)	20
Switzerland (Schweizer Hitparade)	36
UK Singles (OCC)	71
US Mainstream Top 40 (Billboard)	46
US Rhythmic Top 40 (Billboard)	50

Year-end chart performance
Chart (2000)	Position
Europe (Eurochart Hot 100)	69
France (SNEP)	63
New Zealand (RIANZ)	35
US Mainstream Top 40 (Billboard)	74

== Certifications and sales ==
Certifications
Region	Certification	Certified units/sales
Australia (ARIA)	Platinum	70,000^{^}
Belgium (BRMA)	Platinum	50,000^{*}
France (SNEP)	Gold	250,000^{*}
Germany (BVMI)	Gold	250,000^{^}
New Zealand (RMNZ) Physical sales	Gold	5,000^{*}
New Zealand (RMNZ) Digital sales + streaming	Gold	15,000^{‡}
Sweden (GLF)	Platinum	30,000^{^}
United Kingdom (BPI)	Gold	489,000
United States (RIAA)	Platinum	1,000,000^{‡}
^{*} Sales figures based on certification alone.^{^} Shipments figures based on certification alone.^{‡} Sales+streaming figures based on certification alone.

== Release history ==
Release dates and formats for "(You Drive Me) Crazy"
Region	Date	Format(s)	Label(s)	Ref.
United States	August 24, 1999	Contemporary hit radio; rhythmic contemporary radio	Jive	
Germany	September 13, 1999	Maxi CD	Rough Trade	
United Kingdom	September 20, 1999	Cassette; maxi CD	Rough Trade	
United States	September 28, 1999	12-inch vinyl	Jive	
Japan	September 29, 1999	Maxi CD	Avex Trax	
France	November 16, 1999	CD	Jive	

== Bibliography ==
- Bennett, Andy; Peterson, Richard A. (2004). Music scenes: local, translocal and virtual. Vanderbilt University Press. ISBN 978-0-8265-1451-6.
