= From the Bottom of My Broken Heart =

1999 single by Britney Spears

Single by Britney Spears

from the album ...Baby One More Time
- B-side: "Thinkin' About You"
- Released: December 14, 1999
- Recorded: 1997
- Studio: 4MW East (New Jersey); Battery (New York City)
- Genre: Teen pop
- Length: 4:34 (single edit); 5:12 (album version)
- Label: Jive
- Songwriter: Eric Foster White
- Producer: Eric Foster White

Britney Spears singles chronology
"Born to Make You Happy" (1999)	"From the Bottom of My Broken Heart" (1999)	"Oops!... I Did It Again" (2000)

Music video
- "From The Bottom Of My Broken Heart" on YouTube

"From the Bottom of My Broken Heart" is a song by American singer Britney Spears from her debut studio album, ...Baby One More Time (1999). It was released on December 14, 1999, by Jive Records as the fifth and final single from the album. After Spears recorded an unused song from Toni Braxton and sent it through Larry Rudolph to several labels, executives from Jive Records commented that it was very rare to hear someone so young who could deliver emotional content and commercial appeal, appointing the singer to work with producer Eric Foster White. The teen pop ballad was written and produced by White, and features Spears singing about the loss of a first love and how breaking up can be hard.

"From the Bottom of My Broken Heart" received mixed to positive reviews from music critics, who noted the song as a classic hit and competent single, despite considering it unremarkable like other ballads on the album and calling it "another rejection ballad that refers to kissing but nothing else". "From the Bottom of My Broken Heart" achieved moderate success, peaking at number 37 in Australia, and 23 in New Zealand. In the United States, "From the Bottom of My Broken Heart" reached number 14 on the Billboard Hot 100, and 17 on Pop Songs, being later certified Platinum by the Recording Industry Association of America (RIAA) on March 28, 2000, for shipping 1,000,000 physical units of the single. It was the 8th best-selling physical single of the 2000s in the country.

An accompanying music video, directed by Gregory Dark from November 22–23, 1999, was released on December 17, 1999. It portrayed Spears packing her belongings as she readies herself to move away from home, and feeling upset because she knows that she is going to miss her first love. The video was the subject of controversy among the press, who panned the singer for hiring an adult filmmaker to direct her video. A Spears representative commented that they were only aware of Dark doing music videos. The singer performed "From the Bottom of My Broken Heart" in a few live appearances, including at the 42nd Annual Grammy Awards, in a medley with "...Baby One More Time", and in three of her concert tours.

== Background ==
In June 1997, Spears was in talks with manager Lou Pearlman to join female pop group Innosense. Her mother Lynne asked family friend and entertainment lawyer Larry Rudolph for his opinion and submitted a tape of Spears singing over a Whitney Houston karaoke song along with some pictures. Rudolph decided he wanted to pitch her to record labels, therefore she needed a professional demo. He sent Spears an unused song from Toni Braxton; she rehearsed for a week and recorded her vocals in a studio with a sound engineer. Spears traveled to New York with the demo and met with executives from four labels, returning to Kentwood the same day. Three of the labels rejected her, arguing audiences wanted pop bands such as the Backstreet Boys and the Spice Girls, and "there wasn't going to be another Madonna, another Debbie Gibson, or another Tiffany." Two weeks later, executives from JIVE Records returned calls to Rudolph. Senior vice president of A&R Jeff Fenster stated about Spears's audition that "It's very rare to hear someone that age who can deliver emotional content and commercial appeal. [...] For any artist, the motivation—the 'eye of the tiger'— is extremely important. And Britney had that." They appointed her to work with producer Eric Foster White for a month, who reportedly shaped her voice from "lower and less poppy" delivery to "distinctively, unmistakably Britney." After hearing the recorded material, president Clive Calder ordered a full album. "From the Bottom of My Broken Heart" was written by Eric Foster White, for Spears' debut studio album, ...Baby One More Time (1999). Spears recorded the vocals for the song in 1997 at 4MW East Studios in New Jersey and at Battery Studios in New York City, New York. Dan Petty played the guitar, while the bass guitar was done by Andy Hess. The song was later mixed by White and Chris Trevett, while background vocals were provided by Spears, Angie Simmons, Don Philip and Andrew Fromm. It was released on December 15, 1999, as the final single from ...Baby One More Time.

== Composition ==
"From the Bottom of My Broken Heart"
A 26-second sample of the song's chorus, which features Spears singing about the loss of a first love over a teen pop background.

"From the Bottom of My Broken Heart" was produced by Eric Foster White. Described by Spears as a "soulful" ballad, it draws influence from teen pop and lasts for five minutes and ten seconds. Chuck Taylor of Billboard noted that the singer "turn toward the sad side" on the track, with its lyrics talking about the loss of a first love and how breaking up can be hard. As the song begins, Spears declares, "'Never look back', we said / How was I to know I'd miss you so? / Loneliness up ahead, emptyness behind / Where do I go?" During the chorus, she realizes that she has lost her true love, stating, "From the bottom of my broken heart, even though time may find me somebody new / You were my real love, I never knew love, till there was you." According to sheet music published at musicnotes.com by Universal Music Publishing Group, "From the Bottom of My Broken Heart" is composed in the key of G major and is set in time signature of common time with a slowly tempo of 76 beats per minute.

The single's B-side, "Thinkin' About You", is also a teen pop influenced song. The song is composed in the key of G major and is set in time signature of common time with a moderate tempo of 96 beats per minute. Spears vocal range spans over two octaves from the low note of G_{3} to the high note D_{5} Craig McDennis of The Hamilton Spectator said the lyrics of "Thinkin' About You", along with "Born to Make You Happy", "verge on the sort of boy-worshipping dreck that even Tiffany would have sniffed at", while Jane Stevenson of Toronto Sun noted Spears "puts some rather grownup heartfelt soul into [it]".

== Critical response ==
"From the Bottom of My Broken Heart" received mixed to positive reviews from music critics. Amanda Murray of Sputnikmusic considered the song a competent, but unremarkable single. Kyle Anderson of MTV criticized its lyrics, deeming it as "another rejection ballad that references kissing but nothing else". Caryn Ganz of Rolling Stone called "From the Bottom of My Broken Heart" a "further hit" from ...Baby One More Time, along with "Sometimes" and "(You Drive Me) Crazy". The song was a Track Pick from the AllMusic review by Stephen Thomas Erlewine, who praised it along with the other singles from the album, saying, "...Baby One More Time has its share of well-crafted filler, but the singles, combined with Britney's burgeoning charisma, make this a pretty great piece of fluff". Author David Gauntlett considered its lyrics as "slushy", and noticed that the track was "seen as less interesting and relevant [by the fans], although [they] clearly enjoyed [the song] too". Billboard critic Chuck Taylor praised the song, and did a further review on his column:

"'From the Bottom of My Broken Heart' possesses a breezy air that is certain to continue her breakneck success on the singles charts. Eric Foster White is at the helm this time, writing and producing a song that will easily appeal to Miss Spears' young core, with the potential to chart the more mature AC audience, too. [...] Spears' star is shining brighter than ever, and this wholesome track will only serve to illuminate it all the more. An ace".

Also from Billboard, Chuck Arnold wrote that "there’s just not enough depth or texture to her voice, but the little quiver in her chirp does serve her well on the final single from the album, a weepie one about losing your first love". The staff from Entertainment Weekly placed it at number 135 on their ranking of Spears's songs. Bustle's Alex Kristelis said that "I can roll with cheesy, but ['From the Bottom of My Broken Heart'] is just too much!". Nicholas Hautman, from Us Weekly, was more positive and opined that "this teenybopper torch song is no 'Sometimes', but it’s a classic in Spears’ catalog that some fans unfairly push to the side".

== Chart performance ==
On the chart issue dated February 19, 2000, "From the Bottom of My Broken Heart" was at number 52 on United States' Billboard Hot 100. The following issue, the song peaked at number 14, after selling 78,000 physical units of the single, and became the Greatest Gainer/Sales title of that week. The song also went from number 73 to number three on the Hot Singles Sales chart, before peaking at number one on the chart issue dated March 4, 2000. "From the Bottom of My Broken Heart" also appeared on several Billboard component charts, peaking at number 24 on Top 40 Tracks, number 17 on Pop Songs, and number 53 on Radio Songs. On March 28, 2000, "From the Bottom of My Broken Heart" was certified platinum by the Recording Industry Association of America (RIAA), for shipping 1,000,000 physical units of the single in the country. By the end of 2000, the song peaked at number 77 on the Billboard Hot 100 Year-End chart. "From the Bottom of My Broken Heart" was the eighth best-selling physical single of the 2000s, according to Nielsen SoundScan. As of June 2012, "From the Bottom of My Broken Heart" has sold 778,000 physical singles, with 33,000 paid digital downloads in the United States. It is Spears' second best-selling physical single in the country. In Australia, "From the Bottom of My Broken Heart" entered the ARIA chart at number 47, before peaking at number 37 on the following issue. The song stayed a total of five weeks on the chart. It performed better in New Zealand, where it peaked at number 23. In Canada, after staying for five weeks on the RPM Singles Chart, the song peaked at number 25 on the dated week of February 28, 2000.

== Music video ==
=== Background and synopsis ===
Spears ready to move away from home with her belongings in the music video

Jive Records commissioned a music video for the song to be directed by Gregory Dark. According to Dark, the label hired him with the intention of re-image Spears from the naughty schoolgirl persona of "...Baby One More Time", and stated that they "wanted a much more story-oriented video without dance, one that was serious and emotional." He further stated that, during the filming, "I'd joke with her so that she would loosen up and feel comfortable acting, as opposed to being Britney Spears at that moment." The video was produced by the FM Rocks Production Company.

The music video portrays Spears packing up her belongings, as she readies herself to move away from home, and feeling upset because she knows that she is going to miss her first love. Throughout the video, scenes of the couple's past are also seen and Spears is sitting on a tire swing, including one where they climb up onto a windmill, with Spears singing the song, and Spears is standing by a billboard that reads "Welcome to Cedar Springs Gardens" similar to the video "Lucky". Before the end of the video, Spears is waiting at a bus stop while, at the same time, her first love is driving to come see her one last time. However, by the time he finally gets there, Spears had left him behind and taken the bus.

=== Reception ===
According to writer Linda Ruth Williams, the music video attracted attention from the press because of "the clash between Spears' wholesome image and Dark's unwholesome back catalogue." A Spears representative spoke to the Sunday Sport and revealed, "as far as I'm aware the director just does music videos. This is a video for young teenage girls and not sexy at all." Dark responded to the negative reviews saying, "I don't deny that I did [adult films], it's just that I also like people to know that I don't currently and haven't in a long time." Billboard reporter Carla Hay also noted, "I don't think people who buy records are too concerned about the background of the video's director." Lucy O'Brien, author of She Bop II: The Definitive History of Women in Rock, Pop and Soul, noted that hiring Dark as the video director implied that Spears was not that innocent. Time journalists Briton Hadden and Henry Robinson Luce said that Spears "may be the queen of pop tartiness, but her new video, 'From the Bottom of My Broken Heart', is an entirely wholesome affair," while Chris Ryan of MTV considered it "a suitably soft-focus affair". The video was also added to MTV's 2000 Yearbook, a list with the "biggest, best, most memorable music videos of every year since the beginning of MTV."

Alec Hanley Bemis of LA Weekly highly criticized Spears and the music video. He thought that the singer's "lack of musical talent" had begun to affect her career, after Dark was selected as the director of the video. Bemis commented, however, that Spears already had "a history of questionable decisions", and cited her Rolling Stone photoshoot done in early 1999, which was condemned by the American Family Association, as an example. He continued to state that the plotline set the singer "on the fast track to adulthood" and questioned, "who's in bed with Britney now? While a TV tabloid recently reported that an old bayou beau in Louisiana has mother Spears’ approval, fantasizing fans want to believe Britney's dallying with that braided moppet from N’Sync or a member of the Backstreet Boys. But the only verifiable fact we have to work with is that Spears has started running with a darker L.A. crowd." Bemis finished his review saying that "no avant-garde film techniques [were used on it]. But Britney's lips glisten so... Speaking frankly, this light in our lives hurts us, from the fire in our loins to the bottom of our broken hearts."

== Live performances ==
"From the Bottom of My Broken Heart" was performed for the first time on the ...Baby One More Time Tour in Pompano Beach, Florida, U.S.A at June 28, 1999. After its release as a single, Spears performed the song in a medley with "...Baby One More Time" at the 42nd Annual Grammy Awards. Spears was wearing a turtleneck and a full tulle skirt at the beginning of the performance, while dancers surrounded her with enormous hand fans. After singing a shortened version of the song, she then took a few moments to shuffle into a form-fitting red rhinestone outfit (with side cutouts) and emerged onto a stage to perform "...Baby One More Time." Jocelyn Vena of MTV included the performance on her list of Spears' Top 10 Best TV Performances. Spears also performed the song on her 2000s Crazy 2k Tour, where her dancers picked a boy from the audience and invited him onstage, while Spears dedicated the performance of "From the Bottom of My Broken Heart" to the boy. The same year, the song was performed for the last time on Oops!... I Did It Again Tour. Wearing glittery jeans and an orange halter top, she performed an acoustic version of the song with her guitarist Skip. Spears also performed "From the Bottom of My Broken Heart" and "Born to Make You Happy" on Disney Channel in Concert in 1999. The performances were recorded and included on Spears' first home video release, Time Out with Britney Spears. The song was also performed in the television program Good Morning America on January 7, 2000, along with "...Baby One More Time".

== Track listings ==
- Australian CD maxi single
1. "From the Bottom of My Broken Heart" (Radio Edit) – 4:34
2. "(You Drive Me) Crazy" (Jazzy Jim's Hip-Hop Mix) – 3:40
3. "Thinkin' About You" – 3:35
4. "Sometimes" Answering Machine Message – 0:25
- US CD and Cassette single
1. "From the Bottom of My Broken Heart" (Radio Edit) – 4:34
2. "(You Drive Me) Crazy" (Jazzy Jim's Hip-Hop Mix) – 3:40
- Digital download (Digital 45)
1. "From the Bottom of My Broken Heart" (Radio Edit) – 4:34
2. "Thinkin' About You" – 3:35

== Credits and personnel ==
Credits for "From the Bottom of My Broken Heart" are adapted from ...Baby One More Time's liner notes.

- Britney Spears – lead vocals
- Eric Foster White – audio mixing, producer, songwriting
- Chris Trevett – audio mixing
- Dan Petty – guitar
- Andy Hess – bass guitar, bass, guitar

== Charts ==
=== Weekly charts ===
Weekly chart performance for "From the Bottom of My Broken Heart"
Chart (2000)	Peak position
Australia (ARIA)	37
Canada Top Singles (RPM)	25
Canada Adult Contemporary (RPM)	41
New Zealand (Recorded Music NZ)	23
US Billboard Hot 100	14
US Pop Airplay (Billboard)	17
US Rhythmic Airplay (Billboard)	26

=== Year-end charts ===
Year-end chart performance for "From the Bottom of My Broken Heart"
Chart (2000)	Position
US Billboard Hot 100	77

=== Decade-end charts ===
Decade-end chart performance for "From the Bottom of My Broken Heart"
Chart (2000–2009)	Position
US Hot Singles Sales (Billboard)	8

== Certifications ==
Certifications for "From the Bottom of My Broken Heart"
Region	Certification	Certified units/sales
United States (RIAA)	Platinum	1,000,000^{^}
^{^} Shipments figures based on certification alone.

== Release history ==
Release dates and formats for "From the Bottom of My Broken Heart"
Region	Date	Format(s)	Label	Ref.
United States	December 14, 1999	Contemporary hit radio; rhythmic contemporary radio	Jive	
United States	January 24, 2000	Hot adult contemporary radio	Jive	
Australia	February 1, 2000	Maxi CD	Festival Mushroom	
United States	February 8, 2000	Cassette; maxi CD	Jive	
