= Polaroid i-Zone =

Instant film camera

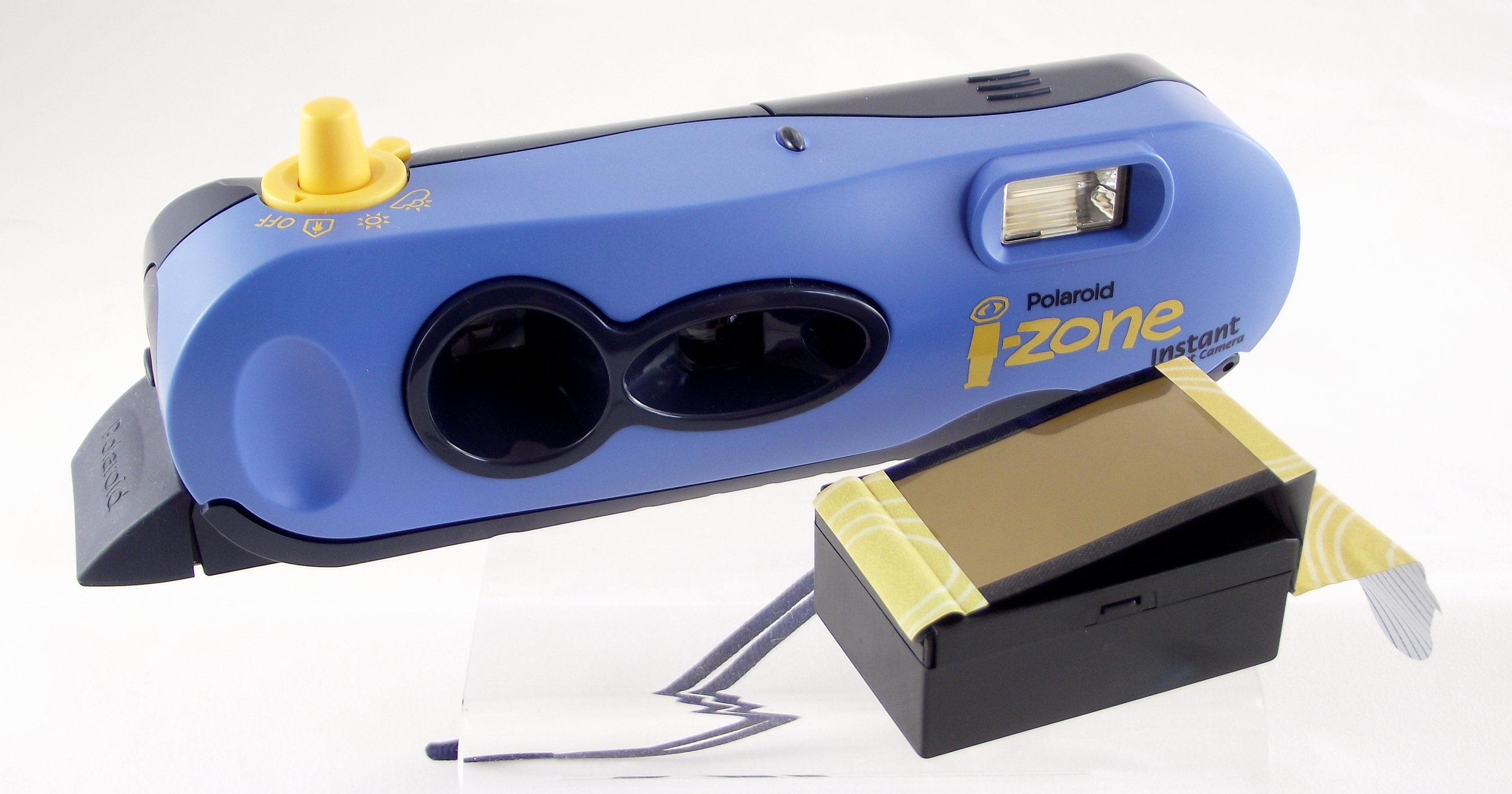
Polaroid i-Zone camera and cartridge

The Polaroid i-Zone is a type of instant film camera manufactured for the Polaroid Corporation by Japanese toy manufacturer Tomy. Introduced in 1999, the i-Zone was the world's best-selling camera in 1999 and 2000.

== Design ==
This camera took pictures 1.5"x1", that came on a pull-out strip of paper. The strip was decorated and could later be cut to the size of the photo when the image was finished developing. Special film that had an adhesive back for mounting the prints was also available. Unusually, the shutter was not mounted behind the lens, but rather perpendicular to the lens, hovering just above the film. A mirror behind the lens would project the picture through the shutter onto the film below. The camera was mostly marketed at children with its simple functionality, low-cost, and oblong shape. A major marketing point for the camera was its ease of use: the camera had only three aperture settings, selected by a lever that pointed to a picture representing when each setting would be appropriate, be it indoors, outdoors on a sunny day, or outdoors on a cloudy day. After taking a photo, the lever would automatically revert to the off position to save power.

Film for this camera was discontinued in 2006, shortly after which all film would have now passed their expiry date; there have been a number of comments made on the internet that unused/unopened film will no longer work.

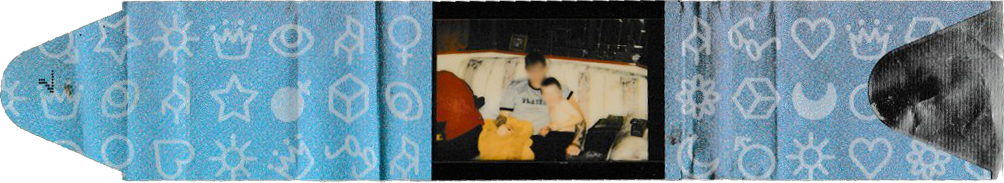
An example of a photograph taken by the i-Zone (faces blurred by Image editing intentionally)

== i-Zone 200 camera ==
=== Features ===
- Automatic flash
- Automatic focus
- Flash-ready light
- Wrist strap
- One-year limited warranty

=== Specifications ===
- Power: 2 AAA batteries
- Focus range: 2 – Infinity
- Auto flash range: 2 – 8 ft., charge time approx. 5 seconds
- Film format: Polaroid izone200 instant film; 12-frame packs
