= Sometimes (Britney Spears song) =

1999 single by Britney Spears

- Standard artwork, used for most non-US commercial releases and US promotional single

Single by Britney Spears

from the album ...Baby One More Time
- B-side: "I'm So Curious"
- Released: April 6, 1999
- Recorded: May 1998
- Studio: Cheiron (Stockholm)
- Genre: Bubblegum pop
- Length: 4:05 (album version); 3:55 (radio edit)
- Label: Jive
- Songwriter: Jörgen Elofsson
- Producers: Per Magnusson; David Kreuger; Jörgen Elofsson

Britney Spears singles chronology
"...Baby One More Time" (1998)	"Sometimes" (1999)	"(You Drive Me) Crazy" (1999)

Music video
- "Sometimes" on YouTube

"Sometimes" is a song by American singer Britney Spears from her first album, ...Baby One More Time (1999). Written by Jörgen Elofsson and produced by Elofsson, Per Magnusson and David Kreuger, the song was released as Spears' second single on April 6, 1999, by Jive Records. "Sometimes" is a bubblegum pop ballad that alludes to a relationship in which a shy girl asks her lover to take it slow. The song received generally favorable reviews from contemporary critics.

"Sometimes" attained worldwide success, peaking inside the top ten in multiple countries. In the United States, the song peaked at number 21 on the Billboard Hot 100. The song reached number one in Belgium (Flanders), Netherlands and New Zealand, while reaching number two in Australia. In the United Kingdom, the song reached number three, and is also Spears' third best-selling single in the country. An accompanying music video, directed by Nigel Dick, was shot at the Paradise Cove in Malibu, California. It portrays Spears watching her love interest from afar. Spears has performed "Sometimes" in four of her concert tours: the ...Baby One More Time Tour (1999), the (You Drive Me) Crazy Tour (2000), the Oops!... I Did It Again Tour (2000–01), and the Dream Within a Dream Tour (2001–02).

== Background ==
Before recording her debut album ...Baby One More Time, Britney Spears had originally envisioned it in the style of "Sheryl Crow music, but younger [and] more adult contemporary". However, the singer agreed with her label Jive's appointment of producers, who had the objective to reach a teen public at the time. She flew to Cheiron Studios in Stockholm, Sweden, where half of the album was recorded the spring of 1998, with producers Max Martin and Rami Yacoub, among others. "Sometimes" was written by Jörgen Elofsson, and produced by Per Magnusson and David Kreuger. In an interview, Jive Records and Britney Spears A&R Steve Lunt said when the song was pitched, the lyrics were much more adult. Lunt gave the note that the song would be recorded by a teenager and therefore lyrics needed to be changed. Spears recorded the vocals for the song in May 1998, at Cheiron Studios in Stockholm, Sweden. It was also mixed at Cheiron Studios by Martin. Esbjörn Öhrwall played the acoustic guitar, while bass guitar was done by Thomas Lindberg. Keyboards and programming was done by Kreuger, and additional keyboards by Magnusson. Background vocals were provided by Anders von Hoffsten. Spears also co-wrote and recorded a track called "I'm So Curious", produced by Eric Foster White, that was released as a B-side to "Sometimes". The track was recorded in 1997 at 4MW East Studios in New Jersey. "Sometimes" was released as the second single from ...Baby One More Time on April 30, 1999.

=== Songwriting controversy ===
The song created controversy over the writing credits. Steve Wallace, an Indiana songwriter, claimed he wrote "Sometimes" in 1990, but did not copyright it until 2003, four years after Spears registered the song's copyright. Wallace claimed Spears confessed he wrote the song, by showing to the court a possible e-mail from the singer, which said, "I now know for a fact that you wrote ['Sometimes']. But there's nothing I can do about it. That's all I can say about it." The e-mail was considered fake and the lawsuit was dismissed on October 31, 2005, when Judge John D. Tinder ruled that the singer did not steal the song.

== Composition ==
"Sometimes"
A 22-second sample of the song's chorus, where Spears sings over a bubblegum pop production.

"Sometimes" is a romantic bubblegum pop song, with a length of four minutes and four seconds. The song is composed in the key of B♭ major and is set in time signature of common time with a moderately slow tempo of 96 beats per minute. After the bridge, it transposes to B major. Spears' vocal range spans almost two octaves from the low note F_{3} to the high note E_{5}. The song has a sequence of Cm_{11}–F_{7}sus–B♭–B♭(9)/D–F/A–F as its chord progression. Stephen Thomas Erlewine of AllMusic said that "Sometimes" and the album's other hit songs revealed Max Martin's mastery of the pop hook, Eurodance rhythm, and memorable melody.

Lyrically, the song is a "heartbroken ballad", where Spears declares on the introduction, "You tell me you're in love with me / That you can't take your pretty eyes away from me / It's not that I don't wanna stay / But every time you come too close I move away". According to musicologist Melanie Lowe, "Spears shows a different side of her personality [with 'Sometimes'] than she does in her other songs." Both of them also commented the song "lacks rhythmic drive and the backing track is fuller, with smoother and rounder synthesized instruments", while describing Spears' vocals as more natural when compared to "...Baby One More Time" and "(You Drive Me) Crazy".

== Critical reception ==
"The positive message the girls find in 'Sometimes' lies not so much in the song itself, but rather in its contrast—both lyrical and musical—with Spears's other songs. In the end, the girls celebrate the many sides of Britney and the idea, communicated musically, that she has different 'personalities'".

— Musicologist Melanie Lowe on the positive message behind "Sometimes".

A reviewer from CD Universe commented that the song "warns a potential love of [Spears'] need for time and patience, rolling along nicely with a slow groove and a big beat". Amanda Murray of Sputnikmusic considered "Sometimes" a competent single, but claimed the song as unremarkable. Kyle Anderson of MTV said that the song "introduces the first sorta-ballad to [...Baby One More Time]", and considered it "reasonable enough, though through three songs, Spears' lyric approach appears to be entirely about guys. Like, she never stops thinking about them". Caryn Ganz of Rolling Stone called "Sometimes" a "further hit" from ...Baby One More Time, along with "From the Bottom of My Broken Heart" and "(You Drive Me) Crazy". Spence D. of IGN considered "Sometimes" a "[Max Martin] glossy grown-up pop" song, while Annabel Leathes of BBC Online said the song "represents the innocent years when Britney annoyed and titillated in equal measure".

Nicholas Hautman, from Us Weekly, deemed it "the epitome of bubblegum pop, a genre that unjustly got a bad rap. Its key change is what dreams are made of". Bustle's Alex Kristelis called it "a perfect example of good cheese". While reviewing ...Baby One More Time on its 20th anniversary, Billboard's Chuck Arnold felt that "there is a wistful melancholy to this diary entry of a song that digs deeper into the doubts and insecurities below the bubbly surface of both 'Crazy' and the title track". The staff from Entertainment Weekly placed it at number 22 on their ranking of Spears's songs and said that "not quite a ballad, not yet a banger, ['Sometimes'] cemented Britney as pop's good girl of '99". For Daniel Megarry from Gay Times, it was one of the "standout tracks" from ...Baby One More Time and wrote that "it’s impossible not to feel nostalgia when the summery strings of 'Sometimes' grace your eardrums". Nayer Nissim, from Pink News, deemed it one of Spears' "more adult (but not adult) early tracks that drips with '90s singer-songwritery charm". Shannon Barbour from Cosmopolitan opined that it was "cool, but mostly forgettable". During the 2000 BMI Pop Awards, "Sometimes" was honored with the award of Most Performed BMI Song. In 2017, ShortList's Dave Fawbert listed the song as containing "one of the greatest key changes in music history".

== Commercial performance ==
"Sometimes" achieved commercial success worldwide. The song reached number one in Belgium (Flanders), Netherlands and New Zealand, and was certified Gold in the latter by the Recording Industry Association of New Zealand (RIANZ), for selling more than 7,500 physical units of the single. It also peaked at number two in Australia, where it was later certified Platinum by the Australian Recording Industry Association (ARIA), after shipping over 70,000 units, and number four in Finland and Sweden, while reaching the top ten on other five music charts. "Sometimes" was also successful in the United Kingdom. It entered and peaked at number three on the UK Singles Chart on June 26, 1999. According to the Official Charts Company, "Sometimes" is Spears' seventh best-selling single in the United Kingdom, with sales over 456,000 physical units. In the United States, the song peaked at number 21 on the Billboard Hot 100 on the week of July 24, 1999, while reaching number 11 and 29 on the Adult Contemporary and Adult Pop Songs charts, respectively. Even though the song enjoyed heavy airplay, it was not available physically to spur album sales. It also managed to peak at number six on the Mainstream Top 40 chart. "Sometimes" was also certified Gold by the Syndicat National de l'Édition Phonographique (SNEP), for sales over 250,000 units of the single in France, where it peaked at number 13.

== Music video ==
Spears with her love interest in the music video

Spears started rehearsing for the music video for "Sometimes" in February 1999. However, during the rehearsals, the singer injured her knee and was forced to start sessions of physical therapy. A month later, Spears released in a statement: "I want to thank my wonderful fans and all of the people who have offered their love and support during this time," while revealing she would not be able to shoot the music video until April 1999. The music video was later directed by Nigel Dick, who also directed her previous video for Spears' 1998 debut single "...Baby One More Time". It was shot at the Paradise Cove in Malibu, California. The music video was released on May 6, 1999, on Total Request Live.

According to MTV, the initial concept for the music video was to portray Spears on the porch of a beachfront home watching a group of kids having fun, prompting flashbacks about her former boyfriend. However, the video begins with Spears, in a long sleeveless white dress, walking barefoot through a lawn to a telescope, and looking through it. The concept was later changed to a man and a dog walking on the beach, portraying the singer as the girl next door, watching her love interest, played by model Chad Cole, from afar. The beach location was kept, and the music video intercuts with scenes of Spears' dancing on the Paradise Cove pier with her dancers dressed all in beach-friendly white attire, then Spears sits near a car. A writer of Rolling Stone noted the video is best known for "purifying the sexy persona Spears introduced in the '... Baby One More Time' video", while describing it as "a virginal Britney in a long, flowing white dress (and other demure outfits) gazing at a clean-cut boy on the beach, then she walks on the balcony with a pink ball and does some chaste choreography that features her dancers forming a heart while she sings that she only wants to "hold you tight, treat you right." Spears is sitting on a picnic blanket wishing she was there with him. She leaves alone." On February 20, 2012, behind the scenes footage of the music video leaked online.

== Track listings ==
- European CD single
1. "Sometimes" (Radio Edit) – 3:55
2. "Sometimes" (Soul Solution Mid Tempo Mix) – 3:29
- Australian and European CD maxi single
1. "Sometimes" (Radio Edit) – 3:55
2. "I'm So Curious" – 3:35
3. "Sometimes" (Soul Solution Mid Tempo Mix) – 3:29
- UK CD maxi single
1. "Sometimes" (Radio Edit) – 3:55
2. "Sometimes" (Soul Solution Mid Tempo Mix) – 3:29
3. "I'm So Curious" – 3:35
- Japanese CD maxi single
1. "Sometimes" (Radio Edit) – 3:55
2. "...Baby One More Time" (Sharp Platinum Vocal Remix) – 8:11
3. "...Baby One More Time" (Davidson Ospina Club Mix) – 5:40
- Cassette single
1. "Sometimes" (Radio Edit) – 3:55
2. "I'm So Curious" – 3:35

== Credits and personnel ==
Credits for "Sometimes" and "I'm So Curious" are taken from the single's liner notes.

"Sometimes"

- Britney Spears – lead vocals, background vocals
- Jörgen Elofsson – songwriting
- David Kreuger – producer, keyboards, programming
- Per Magnusson – producer, keyboards
- Anders von Hoffsten – background vocals
- Esbjörn Öhrwall – acoustic guitar, guitar
- Thomas Lindberg – bass guitar, bass, guitar
- Max Martin – mixing
- Tom Coyne – audio mastering

"I'm So Curious"

- Britney Spears – lead vocals, background vocals, songwriting
- Eric Foster White – songwriting, producer, mixing, bass guitar, bass, guitar, keyboards, programming
- Dan Petty – acoustic guitar, guitar
- Tom Coyne – audio mastering

== Charts ==
=== Weekly charts ===
Weekly chart performance for "Sometimes"
Chart (1999)	Peak position
Australia (ARIA)	2
Austria (Ö3 Austria Top 40)	6
Belgium (Ultratop 50 Flanders)	1
Belgium (Ultratop 50 Wallonia)	6
Canada Top Singles (RPM)	7
Canada Adult Contemporary (RPM)	5
Czech Republic (IFPI)	1
Denmark (IFPI)	7
Europe (European Hot 100 Singles)	3
El Salvador (Notimex)	1
Finland (Suomen virallinen lista)	4
France (SNEP)	13
Germany (GfK)	6
Honduras (Notimex)	1
Hungary (Mahasz)	8
Iceland (Íslenski Listinn Topp 40)	25
Ireland (IRMA)	5
Italy (Musica e dischi)	6
Italy Airplay (Music & Media)	10
Netherlands (Dutch Top 40)	1
Netherlands (Single Top 100)	1
New Zealand (Recorded Music NZ)	1
Nicaragua (Notimex)	4
Norway (VG-lista)	13
Scottish Singles Sales (Official Charts)	5
Spain (Promusicae)	13
Sweden (Sverigetopplistan)	4
Switzerland (Schweizer Hitparade)	7
UK Singles (Official Charts)	3
UK Airplay (Music Week)	6
UK Independent (Official Charts)	1
US Billboard Hot 100	21
US Adult Contemporary (Billboard)	11
US Adult Pop Airplay (Billboard)	29
US Pop Airplay (Billboard)	6
US Rhythmic Airplay (Billboard)	12

=== Year-end charts ===
Year-end chart performance for "Sometimes"
Chart (1999)	Position
Australia (ARIA)	22
Belgium (Ultratop 50 Flanders)	11
Belgium (Ultratop 50 Wallonia)	28
Canada Top Singles (RPM)	32
Canada Adult Contemporary (RPM)	44
Europe (European Hot 100)	37
Europe Radio (Music & Media)	20
France (SNEP)	54
Germany (Media Control)	57
Italy (Musica e dischi)	96
Netherlands (Dutch Top 40)	12
Netherlands (Single Top 100)	20
New Zealand (RIANZ)	20
Romania (Romanian Top 100)	10
Sweden (Hitlistan)	27
Switzerland (Schweizer Hitparade)	38
UK Singles (OCC)	34
UK Airplay (Music Week)	36
US Billboard Hot 100	86
US Adult Contemporary (Billboard)	32
US Adult Top 40 (Billboard)	94
US Mainstream Top 40 (Billboard)	34
US Rhythmic Top 40 (Billboard)	53

== Certifications ==
Certifications for "Sometimes"
Region	Certification	Certified units/sales
Australia (ARIA)	Platinum	70,000^{^}
Belgium (BRMA)	Platinum	50,000^{*}
France (SNEP)	Gold	250,000^{*}
Netherlands (NVPI)	Gold	50,000^{^}
New Zealand (RMNZ)	Gold	15,000^{‡}
Sweden (GLF)	Gold	15,000^{^}
United Kingdom (BPI)	Platinum	600,000^{‡}
United States (RIAA)	Gold	500,000^{‡}
^{*} Sales figures based on certification alone.^{^} Shipments figures based on certification alone.^{‡} Sales+streaming figures based on certification alone.

== Release history ==
Release dates and formats for "Sometimes"
Region	Date	Format(s)	Label(s)	Ref.
United States	April 6, 1999	Contemporary hit radio	Jive	
Japan	April 14, 1999	Maxi CD	Avex Trax	
United States	April 27, 1999	Rhythmic contemporary radio	Jive	
Germany	June 7, 1999	Maxi CD	Rough Trade	
United Kingdom	June 14, 1999	Cassette; maxi CD	Jive	
Belgium	July 27, 1999	CD	Jive	
France	July 27, 1999	CD	Jive	

== Bibliography ==
- Bennett, Andy; Peterson, Richard A. (2004). Music scenes: local, translocal and virtual. Vanderbilt University Press. ISBN 978-0-8265-1451-6.
- Hughes, Mark (2005). Buzzmarketing: get people to talk about your stuff. Penguin Group. ISBN 978-1-59184-092-3.
