= Britney Spears videography =

Videos and media by American singer

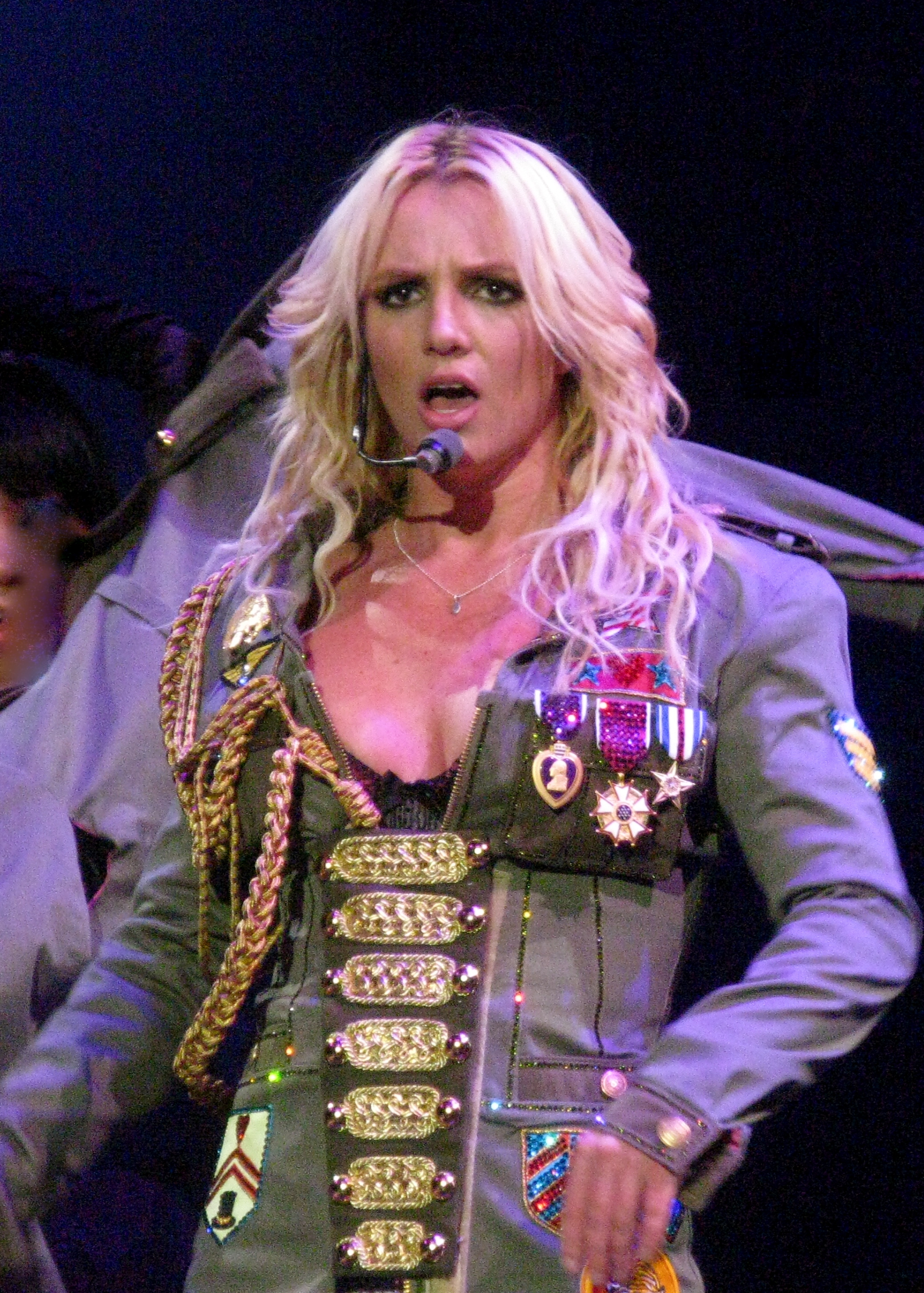
Spears performing during The Circus Starring Britney Spears tour, 2009

American entertainer Britney Spears has released 47 music videos and ten video albums. She has appeared in several films, television shows, and commercials. Spears made her acting debut at age 11 in the television show The All-New Mickey Mouse Club (1993–1994), playing various roles. She then made her feature film debut in Longshot (2001) as a cameo, portraying a flight attendant. In 2002, she starred as Lucy Wagner in Crossroads. The film grossed $61 million worldwide and earned her a nomination for Best Female Breakthrough Performance at the 2002 MTV Movie Awards. The same year, she gave her voice to the character Donner in the American dubbing of Robbie the Reindeer's television specials Hooves of Fire (1999) and Legend of the Lost Tribe (2002). In television series, she portrayed the guest roles of Amber-Louise and Abby in Will & Grace (2006) and How I Met Your Mother (2008), respectively. Spears also has released a few television documentaries, including Britney: For the Record (2008).

In 1998, Spears's first music video "...Baby One More Time", in which she chose to dress as a Catholic schoolgirl, propelled her to superstardom. It ranked number one on TRL's Final Countdown of the most iconic music videos. The music video for the lead single from Spears's second studio album, "Oops!... I Did It Again" (2000), was similarly successful. Set on Mars, Spears dons a tight-fitting red jumpsuit. The "Stronger" music video had a more sophisticated and adult feel to it. 2001's "I'm a Slave 4 U", from her eponymous third studio album Britney, let Spears move further into a more mature territory, performing a complicated dance routine in a risqué outfit.

"Me Against the Music", which featured Madonna, was released in 2003 from Spears's fourth studio release In the Zone. She came up with the storyline for "Toxic", directed by Joseph Kahn. Spears plays three different incarnations of herself and poisons her unfaithful lover. Throughout the video, there are scenes of her naked covered in diamonds. The music video for "Everytime", directed by famed photographer David LaChapelle, was darker than Spears's previous videos. Featuring religious references such as reincarnation, the music video was noted by contemporary critics for predicting her future struggles with fame. Spears made her directional debut with the music video for "Do Somethin'" (2005), credited as her alter ego "Mona Lisa". She co-directed it with Bille Woodruff, who previously worked with her in "Born to Make You Happy" (1999) and the original version of "Overprotected" (2001). The music video for the 2007 lead single "Gimme More", from her fifth studio album Blackout, displayed Spears as a stripper and featured a break from her highly choreographed music videos. "Piece of Me" referenced Spears's life at the time, while "Break the Ice" was accompanied by an animated music video showing Spears as a superheroine.

2008's "Womanizer", from her sixth studio album Circus, was seen as a return to form for Spears. Described as a sequel to "Toxic", the concept was again pitched to director Kahn by Spears. The video for "Circus" portrayed Spears as the ringmaster of a circus accompanied by different performers, and it is interspersed with scenes of Spears in different circus settings. "If U Seek Amy" saw Spears at a sex party that takes place at her house, before she transforms into a typical American housewife, while "Radar" pays tribute to Madonna's "Take a Bow" (1994). The music video for "3" (2009) was described as "simple" and "very, very minimal." The music videos from Spears's seventh and eighth studio albums, Femme Fatale (2011) and Britney Jean (2013), respectively, have all received acclaim from critics and fans alike. She also got credit from critics and fans for her video for "Slumber Party", from her ninth studio album Glory, both released in 2016. It was favourably compared to the videos of "I'm a Slave 4 U" and "Boys" (2002).

Over the years, various music videos of Spears have been hailed for their major impact on pop culture and are deemed amongst the most influential music videos of all time. At the 2011 MTV Video Music Awards, she was honored with the Michael Jackson Video Vanguard Award, presented to her by Lady Gaga, who said "the industry would not be the same without her". Spears ranked at four on VH1's 50 Greatest Women of the Video Era list, ahead of most of her contemporaries and behind only veterans such as Madonna, Janet Jackson, and Whitney Houston. In 2020, Billboard ranked her eight on its 100 Greatest Music Video Artists of All Time list.

== Music videos ==
Title	Year	Other artist(s)	Director(s)	Ref.
"...Baby One More Time"	1998	None	Nigel Dick	
"Sometimes"	1999	None	Nigel Dick	
"(You Drive Me) Crazy" (The Stop! Remix)	1999	None	Nigel Dick	
"Born to Make You Happy"	1999	None	Bille Woodruff	
"From the Bottom of My Broken Heart"	1999	None	Gregory Dark	
"Oops!... I Did It Again"	2000	None	Nigel Dick	
"Lucky"	2000	None	Dave Meyers	
"Stronger"	2000	None	Joseph Kahn	
"Don't Let Me Be the Last to Know"	2001	None	Herb Ritts	
"I'm a Slave 4 U"	2001	None	Francis Lawrence	
"What's Going On"	2001	Artists Against AIDS Worldwide	Jake Scott	
"Overprotected"	2001	None	Bille Woodruff	
"I'm Not a Girl, Not Yet a Woman"	2001	None	Wayne Isham	
"Overprotected" (The Darkchild Remix)	2002	None	Chris Applebaum	
"I Love Rock 'n' Roll"	2002	None	Chris Applebaum	
"Boys" (The Co-Ed Remix)	2002	Pharrell Williams	Dave Meyers	
"Me Against the Music"	2003	Madonna	Paul Hunter	
"Toxic"	2004	None	Joseph Kahn	
"Everytime"	2004	None	David LaChapelle	
"Outrageous" (Note: The music video for "Outrageous" was left unfinished due to Spears falling and injuring her left knee during a dance scene, being ultimately canceled. A 45-second music video composed of the scenes that were shot was included on her Greatest Hits: My Prerogative DVD.)	2004	None	Dave Meyers	
"My Prerogative"	2004	None	Jake Nava	
"Do Somethin'"	2005	None	Bille Woodruff; Britney Spears (Note: Under the pseudonym Mona Lisa.)	
"Someday (I Will Understand)"	2005	None	Michael Haussman	
"Gimme More"	2007	None	Jake Sarfaty	
"Piece of Me"	2007	None	Wayne Isham	
"Break the Ice"	2008	None	Robert Hales	
"Womanizer"	2008	None	Joseph Kahn	
"Circus"	2008	None	Francis Lawrence	
"If U Seek Amy"	2009	None	Jake Nava	
"Radar"	2009	None	Dave Meyers	
"Kill the Lights"	2009	None	PUNY	
"3"	2009	None	Diane Martel	
"Hold It Against Me"	2011	None	Jonas Åkerlund	
"Till the World Ends"	2011	None	Ray Kay	
"I Wanna Go"	2011	None	Chris Marrs Piliero	
"Criminal"	2011	None	Chris Marrs Piliero	
"Scream & Shout"	2012	will.i.am	Ben Mor	
"Scream & Shout" (remix)	2013	will.i.am Hit-Boy; Waka Flocka Flame; Lil Wayne; Diddy	Ben Mor	
"Ooh La La"	2013	None	Marc Klasfeld	
"Work Bitch"	2013	None	Ben Mor	
"Perfume"	2013	None	Joseph Kahn	
"Pretty Girls"	2015	Iggy Azalea	Cameron Duddy; Iggy Azalea	
"Make Me" (Note: The original music video for "Make Me" was directed by David LaChapelle but was ultimately scrapped. According to Spears's then-manager Larry Rudolph, it "just didn't work". The video was leaked in April 2019.)	2016	G-Eazy	David LaChapelle	
"Make Me"	2016	G-Eazy	Randee St. Nicholas	
"Slumber Party"	2016	Tinashe	Colin Tilley	
"Hold Me Closer"	2022	Elton John	Tanu Muino	
"Hold Me Closer" (Joel Corry Remix)	2022	Elton John	Rebekah Creative	
"Hold Me Closer" (acoustic)	2022	Elton John	Tristan Nash	

== Video albums ==
Title	Album details	Certifications
Time Out with Britney Spears	Released: December 21, 1999; Label: Jive; Formats: DVD, VHS	RIAA: 3× Platinum; BVMI: Gold; MC: 4× Platinum
Britney Spears: Live and More!	Released: November 21, 2000; Label: Jive; Formats: DVD, VHS	RIAA: 3× Platinum; BVMI: Gold; BPI: Platinum; SNEP: Platinum
Britney: The Videos	Released: November 20, 2001; Label: Jive; Formats: DVD, VHS	RIAA: 2× Platinum; BPI: Gold; SNEP: Platinum
Britney Spears Live from Las Vegas	Released: January 22, 2002; Label: Jive; Formats: DVD, VHS	RIAA: 2× Platinum; ARIA: Platinum; AMPROFON: Gold; BPI: Gold; SNEP: Platinum
Stages: Three Days in Mexico	Released: November 26, 2002; Label: Jive; Format: DVD	
Britney Spears: In the Zone	Released: April 6, 2004; Label: Jive; Format: DVD/CD	RIAA: 2× Platinum; ARIA: Gold; AMPROFON: Gold; BPI: Gold; CAPIF: Platinum; PMB: Gold
Greatest Hits: My Prerogative	Released: November 9, 2004; Label: Jive; Format: DVD	RIAA: 2× Platinum; ARIA: 2× Platinum; AMPROFON: Gold; CAPIF: 3× Platinum; RIAJ: Gold; SNEP: Platinum
Britney & Kevin: Chaotic... the DVD & More	Released: September 27, 2005; Label: Jive; Format: DVD/CD	
Britney: For the Record	Released: April 7, 2009; Label: Jive; Format: DVD	
Britney Spears Live: The Femme Fatale Tour	Released: November 21, 2011; Label: Jive; Formats: DVD, Blu-ray	RIAA: Platinum; ARIA: Gold

== Filmography ==
=== Film ===
Year	Title	Role	Notes	Ref.
2001	Longshot	Flight Attendant	Cameo	
2002	Crossroads	Lucy Wagner	Also story and executive producer	
2002	Austin Powers in Goldmember	Fembot / Herself	Cameo	
2003	Pauly Shore Is Dead	Herself	Cameo	
2004	Fahrenheit 9/11	Herself	Documentary film; archive footage	
2013	The Smurfs 2	Vexy (singing voice)	Uncredited	
2019	Corporate Animals	Ghost of herself	Voice cameo	

=== Television ===
Year	Title	Role	Notes	Ref.
1992	Star Search	Contestant		
1993–1994	The All-New Mickey Mouse Club	Various roles	Seasons 6–7	
1999	Sabrina the Teenage Witch	Herself	Episode: "No Place Like Home"	
1999	Kenan & Kel	Herself	Episode: "Aww, Here It Goes to Hollywood: Part 2"	
1999	The Famous Jett Jackson	Herself	Episode: "Ghost Dance"	
1999	Médico de familia	Herself	Episode: "Otra oportunidad"	
2000	The Simpsons	Herself (voice)	Episode: "The Mansion Family"	
2000–2004	All That	Herself / Musical guest	4 episodes	
2000–2003	Saturday Night Live	Various roles	4 episodes	
2002	Hooves of Fire	Donner (voice)	American dub; television special	
2002	Legend of the Lost Tribe	Donner (voice)	American dub; television special	
2003	Punk'd	Herself	Episode: "Rosario Dawson, Britney Spears"	
2004	Brave New Girl	–	Television film; executive producer	
2005	Britney and Kevin: Chaotic	Herself	5 episodes; also executive producer	
2006	Will & Grace	Amber-Louise	Episode: "Buy, Buy Baby"	
2008	How I Met Your Mother	Abby	2 episodes	
2008	Britney: For the Record	Herself	Television documentary	
2010	Glee	Herself	Episode: "Britney/Brittany"	
2012	The Pauly D Project	Herself	Episode: "Divas, Diamonds and D****"	
2012	The X Factor	Judge / Mentor	Season 2	
2013	Miley: The Movement	Herself	Television documentary	
2013	I Am Britney Jean	Herself	Television documentary; also executive producer	
2015	Jane the Virgin	Herself	Episode: "Chapter Twenty-Seven"	
2016	Jamie Lynn Spears: When the Lights Go Out	Herself	Television documentary	

== Commercials ==
Year	Company	Promoting	Ref.
1993	Louis Maull Company	Maull's barbecue sauce	
1995	BellSouth	Telephone	
1999	UHA Mikakuto	Candy: Suki	
2000	Time Inc.	Magazine: Teen People	
2000	McDonald's	Your #1 Video Requests... and More! albums HitClips (Note: The commercial also features NSYNC.)	
2001	PepsiCo	Soft drink beverage: Pepsi	
2001	PepsiCo	Sports event: Pepsi 400 (Note: The commercial also features Jeff Gordon.)	
2001	MTV	2001 MTV Video Music Awards (Note: The commercial also features Jamie Foxx.)	
2002	PepsiCo	Soft drink beverage: Pepsi	
2002	PepsiCo	Sports event: 2002 FIFA World Cup	
2002	PepsiCo	Soft drink beverage: Pepsi Twist (Note: The commercial also features Mike Myers as Austin Powers.)	
2002	PlayStation	Video game: Britney's Dance Beat	
2002	Toyota	Car advertisement: Toyota Vios	
2003	Kirin Company	Soft drink beverage: G. G. Tea	
2003	CC Media Holdings, Inc.	Radio station: Z100	
2004	PepsiCo	Soft drink beverage: Pepsi (Note: The commercial also features Beyoncé, Pink, and Enrique Iglesias.)	
2004	Elizabeth Arden, Inc.	Fragrance: Curious	
2008	MTV	2008 MTV Video Music Awards (Note: The commercial also features Russell Brand.)	
2009	MTV	2009 MTV Video Music Awards	
2010	Candie's	Clothing: Limited Edition Collection	
2010	Elizabeth Arden, Inc.	Fragrance: Radiance	
2011	MTV	2011 MTV Video Music Awards	
2012	Hasbro	Game: Twister Dance	
2012	Elizabeth Arden, Inc.	Fragrance: Fantasy Twist	
2015	Elizabeth Arden, Inc.	Fragrance: Fantasy Intimate Edition	
2016	Elizabeth Arden, Inc.	Fragrance: Private Show	
2016	Apple Inc.	Music streaming service: Apple Music (Note: The commercial also features Kevin Bacon.)	
2018	Elizabeth Arden, Inc.	Fragrance: Prerogative	

== See also ==
- Britney Spears discography
