= Britney Spears Live from Las Vegas =

Video by Britney Spears
- Released: January 22, 2002
- Recorded: November 17–18, 2001
- Venues: MGM Grand Garden Arena (Las Vegas, Nevada)
- Genre: Pop
- Length: 90 minutes
- Label: Jive
- Directors: Marty Callner; Britney Spears
- Producers: Marty Callner; Randall Gladstein; Britney Spears

Britney Spears chronology
Britney: The Videos (2001)	Britney Spears Live from Las Vegas (2002)	Stages: Three Days in Mexico (2002)

Britney Spears Live from Las Vegas is the fourth video album by American recording artist Britney Spears. It was released on January 22, 2002 through Jive Records. Recorded during Spears' concert during the Dream Within a Dream Tour (2001–02) at the MGM Grand Garden Arena in Las Vegas, originally broadcast on HBO, Spears performed sixteen songs in between dance routines and costume changes.

== Synopsis ==
On November 17 and 18, 2001, Spears brought her Dream Within a Dream Tour to the MGM Grand Garden Arena in Las Vegas, Nevada. The 18th performance was broadcast live on HBO, and later released on DVD, entitled Britney Spears Live from Las Vegas, on January 22, 2002, containing footage from both concerts. During the concert, Spears is seen doing everything from bungee jumping to playing a jewellery box ballerina, from running through a row of fire trees to "singing in the rain". She is also seen posing as a Janis Joplin wannabe in a comedy take-off of a "Making the Band" documentary.

Britney Spears Live from Las Vegas showcases 16 of Spears's biggest hits from her three multi-platinum albums, ...Baby One More Time (1999), Oops!... I Did It Again (2000) and her then latest release, Britney (2001). The concert is full of effects and costume changes.

== Critical reception ==
Britney Spears Live from Las Vegas received positive reviews from music critics. Jeremy Conrad from IGN Music praised the audio and video quality, and gave the film grade of six out of ten, stating it is "only scoring above average".

== Commercial performance ==
Britney Spears Live from Las Vegas was a commercial success. It peaked atop the US Top Music Videos on March 2, 2002. Internationally, it topped the video charts in Australia and Mexico. It was certified double platinum by the Recording Industry Association of America (RIAA), denoting shipments of over 200,000 copies, as well as receiving platinum and gold certifications in Australia and Mexico, respectively.

== Track listing ==
Britney Spears Live from Las Vegas – North American edition
No.	Title	Length
1.	"Dream Within a Dream" (Video introduction)	4:39
2.	"Oops!... I Did It Again" (Rock version)	3:57
3.	"(You Drive Me) Crazy"	4:03
4.	"It Was All in Your Mind" (Dance interlude)	1:50
5.	"Overprotected"	3:50
6.	"Storytime" (Video interlude, contains elements from "From the Bottom of My Broken Heart" and "Born to Make You Happy")	2:11
7.	"Medley: "Born to Make You Happy"/"Lucky"/"Sometimes"/Storytime (Reprise)"	6:06
8.	"Boys"	3:32
9.	"Stronger"	4:12
10.	"Army Force" (Interlude)	5:17
11.	"I'm Not a Girl, Not Yet a Woman"	4:16
12.	"Making the Band" (Video interlude, contains excerpts from "Who Let the Dogs Out?", "Music" and "I Love Rock 'n' Roll")	3:40
13.	"I Love Rock 'n' Roll"	2:44
14.	"R&R Outro"	1:38
15.	"What's It's Like to Be Me"	2:56
16.	"Lonely"	3:33
17.	"Breakdown" (Performance interlude)	3:42
18.	"Don't Let Me Be the Last to Know"	4:42
19.	"Crayola World" (Video interlude)	0:45
20.	"Anticipating"	4:33
21.	"I'm a Slave 4 U"	8:48
22.	"...Baby One More Time" (Remix)	6:05
23.	"Credits"	2:51
Total length:		89:51

Britney Spears Live from Las Vegas – International edition (special features)
No.	Title	Director(s)	Length
1.	"I'm a Slave 4 U" (Music video)	Francis Lawrence	3:31
2.	"Overprotected" (Music video)	Billie Woodruff	4:01
3.	"I'm Not a Girl, Not Yet a Woman" (Music video)	Wayne Isham	3:53
4.	"Crossroads" (Trailer)		1:20
Total length:			12:45

Notes

- Subtitles available in English, Spanish, French, German and Japanese.

== Accolades ==
Year	Award	Category	Result	Ref.
2002	Primetime Emmy Award	Outstanding Technical Direction, Camerawork, Video Control for a Limited Series, Movie, or Special	Won	
2003	Japan Gold Disc Award	International Music Video of the Year, Long-Form	Won	

== Charts ==
Chart (2002)	Peak position
Australian Music DVD (ARIA)	1
Mexican Music DVD (AMPROFON)	1
US Music Videos (Billboard)	1

== Certifications ==
Region	Certification	Certified units/sales
Argentina (CAPIF)	Platinum	8,000^{^}
Australia (ARIA)	Platinum	15,000^{^}
France (SNEP)	Platinum	20,000^{*}
Mexico (AMPROFON)	Gold	10,000^{^}
Portugal (AFP)	Silver	
South Korea	—	6,437
United Kingdom (BPI)	Gold	25,000^{*}
United States (RIAA)	2× Platinum	200,000^{^}
^{*} Sales figures based on certification alone.^{^} Shipments figures based on certification alone.
