= Stages: Three Days in Mexico =

2002 video album by Britney Spears

Video by Britney Spears
- Released: November 26, 2002
- Recorded: July 26–28, 2002 (Mexico City); April 25, 2002 (Tokyo)
- Genre: Documentary
- Length: 89:31
- Label: Jive
- Director: Judy Hoffman

Britney Spears chronology
Britney Spears Live from Las Vegas (2002)	Stages: Three Days in Mexico (2002)	Britney Spears: In the Zone (2004)

Stages: Three Days in Mexico is the fifth video album by American singer Britney Spears, released on November 26, 2002, through Jive Records. It is a documentary showing a behind-the-scenes look at Spears's Dream Within a Dream Tour as it came to an end in Mexico City.

== Background ==
On September 18, 2002, Jive Records announced the release of a photographic book and DVD titled Stages and Stages: Three Days in Mexico. The DVD was directed by Albert Maysles and chronicled her stay in Mexico and Japan. Spears explained the release, saying, "I wanted to share with my fans all the things that they never get to see that make it all so special for me. It's my way of saying thank you''. As Britney Spears approached her 21st birthday, she was at the height of her fame and grappling with the pressures that came with it. The documentary captures her reflections on fame, performance, and her future in the music industry.

== Synopsis ==
Stages: Three Days in Mexico offers an intimate glimpse into Britney's whirlwind journey during her tour stop in Mexico City. Over the course of three intense days, we witness the highs and lows, the chaos and calm, and the sheer dedication that fuels her performances. The documentary takes us through a microcosm of bodyguards, hotel corridors, and stages. We see the ever-present faceless hordes of hysterical fans, their adoration palpable. But amidst the frenzy, Britney remains grounded, her not-so-commercial southern accent and undeniable natural beauty shining through. As she approaches her 21st birthday, Britney grapples with the weight of fame, the pressures of perfection, and the desire to connect with her audience. Through candid moments, we witness vulnerability—the exhaustion after a show, the quiet contemplation backstage, and the genuine smiles shared with her team.

== Reception ==
The film did not receive a theatrical release and was distributed only as an insert in the back of a Britney photobook, with minimal promotion from the record company. It received additional attention later on thanks to the attention garnered by #FreeBritney, as the film presents a "intensely melancholy" view of Britney facing extreme pressures while on tour. Writing for Business Insider, Jason Guerrasio praised the film, "Stages: Three Days in Mexico" is a must-watch for Spears fans and those who are just fascinated by ever-evolving celebrity culture. What also gives it that I have to see this pull is the fact that it's a lost artifact in Spears' career."

== Track listing ==
The DVD includes footage of rehearsals, performances, and candid moments of Spears and her team as they navigate the complexities of touring. It also features interviews with Big Rob, Felecia, Richard Channer and Spears where she discusses her thoughts and feelings about her life and career.

No.	Title	Length
1.	"Interactive Book"
2.	"Movie"	1:00:18
3.	"Special Features"
4.	"Britney in Japan & Interviews"	29:18
Total length:		89:31

== Photobook ==
Stages: Britney Spears
- Author: Sheryl Berk
- Language: English
- Genre: Photobook
- Publisher: NVU Editions/Team Power Publishing
- Publication date: December 19, 2002
- Publication place: United States
- Media type: Print (paperback)
- Pages: 104
- ISBN: 978-0972457507

In Japan, a photobook titled ‘Stages: Britney Spears’ was released. It features 104 pages of photographs, including images of Britney Spears and moments from her fourth world tour ‘Dream Within a Dream’ tour spanning 2001 to 2002 to promote her self title album Britney. The photobook also includes a poster of Spears laying onto a bed with flowers. At the last page, it includes a DVD attached of Stages: Three Days In Mexico.

== Release history ==
Release dates and formats for Stages: Three Days in Mexico
Region	Date	Format(s)	Label(s)	Ref.
United States	December 7, 2002	Photobook + DVD	Jive	
United States	December 7, 2002	DVD	Jive	
Japan	December 19, 2002	Photobook	Jive	
Japan	February 19, 2003	DVD	Jive	
