= Anticipating =

Single by Britney Spears

from the album Britney
- Released: June 25, 2002
- Recorded: 2001
- Studio: Rusk Sound Studios (Los Angeles, CA); The DOJO (Jackson, NJ); Sound on Sound Studios (New York, NY); Battery Studios (New York, NY)
- Genre: Disco; dance-pop
- Length: 3:16
- Label: Jive
- Songwriters: Britney Spears; Josh Schwartz; Brian Kierulf
- Producers: Brian Kierulf; Josh Schwartz

Britney Spears singles chronology
| "Boys" (2002) | "Anticipating" (2002) | "Me Against the Music" (2003) |

Audio video
- "Anticipating" on YouTube

"Anticipating" is a song by American singer Britney Spears from her eponymous third studio album (2001). It was written by Spears alongside the song's producers Brian Kierulf and Josh Schwartz. The song was released on June 25, 2002, by Jive Records, as the sixth and final single from the album, exclusive to France. "Anticipating" is a disco and dance-pop song, influenced by R&B. Lyrically, the song is about friendship and camaraderie between women. It was met with critical praise, with reviewers complimenting its lyrics and comparing it to the 1980s compositions of Madonna, Rick Astley and Janet Jackson's "All for You".

"Anticipating" achieved minor commercial success, peaking at number 38 on the French Singles Chart. The song was promoted with a performance in the Dream Within a Dream Tour (2001–2002), where Spears wore a patched denim skirt and danced in front of giant crayon drawings. An accompanying music video, directed by Marty Callner, consisted of the performance from Britney Spears Live from Las Vegas. "Anticipating" was also promoted in a commercial Spears filmed for Toyota Vios.

== Background ==
During the Oops!... I Did It Again Tour (2000), Spears revealed she felt inspired by hip hop artists such as Jay-Z and the Neptunes and wanted to create a record with a funkier sound. In February 2001, Spears signed a $7–8 million promotional deal with Pepsi, and released another book co-written with her mother, entitled A Mother's Gift. On the same month, Spears started to record material for her third studio album, with "Anticipating" being recorded at Rusk Sound Studios in Los Angeles, California, the DOJO in Jackson, New Jersey, Sound on Sound Studios and Battery Studios in New York City. The song was written by Spears, Brian Kierulf and Josh Schwartz while produced by Kierulf and Schwartz. It was also mixed at Battery Studios by Stephen George. Audio engineering was done by Aaron Kaplan, Rich Tapper, Jill Tengan and Charles McCrorey. Nile Rodgers played the guitar. Bass guitar and programming was done by Kierulf. Background vocals were provided by Spears and Jennifer Karr. Her third studio album, Britney, was released in November 2001. In an interview with the Daily Record, Spears commented on the track, saying, "It's just a fun song that I wrote. It's just like being with your girlfriends and just dancing. I think this track also has a very Seventies' feel to it." It was released as the fourth single from the album on June 25, 2002, in France only. In other European countries, Spears' cover of "I Love Rock 'n' Roll" was released as the fourth single.

== Composition ==
"Anticipating"
A 21-second sample of the 1970s disco-influenced chorus.

"Anticipating" is a dance-pop song that lasts for three minutes and 16 seconds. Corey Moss of MTV noted the song also has a 1970s disco sound, while Joan Anderman of The Boston Globe compared it to early Madonna tracks such as "Holiday" (1983). Glenn Gamboa of Newsday compared the song to Janet Jackson's "All for You", calling it "pleasant, shimmering R&B-styled pop". According to the sheet music published at musicnotes.com by Universal Music Publishing Group, the song is composed in the key of F major and is set in time signature of common time with a tempo of 112 beats per minute. Spears vocal range spans from the low-key of F_{3} to the high-note of A_{4}. The song has a basic sequence of B♯(9)–C–Dm7–B♯(9) as its chord progression. Lyrically, it talks about friendship and camaraderie between women. During the bridge, Spears sings, "Gotta really let me know if you want me / You gotta turn me on and make me feel sexy". During the time of the album's release, her official site stated that "the girl-power anthem 'Anticipating' proves that Britney is, now more than ever, a force to be reckoned with."

== Reception ==
"Anticipating" received positive reviews music critics. Jane Stevenson of Jam! called "Anticipating" the strongest track in the album. Yale Daily News writer Catherine Halaby called it a "fun, cutesy disco ballad". Nikki Tranker of PopMatters said it "offers Britney's fans something a little different with a simple tune beautifully underlined by a well-executed '70s disco sound". Jim Farber of the New York Daily News while reviewing the Dream Within a Dream Tour named it along with "Stronger", "[two] girl-power anthems". Katie Perone of the Loyola Greyhound said "[it] is a fun, bubbly song that probably would have had great success on Oops!". Barry Walters of Rolling Stone stated the song is "a euphoric Rick Astley flashback, [where] she emotes without framing her vocals in Nickelodeon-schooled theatricality". In a list compiled by Sam Lanksy of PopCrush, "Anticipating" was ranked eight in a list of Spears' best songs. In the album review, David Browne of Entertainment Weekly criticized "Anticipating" along with "Bombastic Love" for "[relying] on enervated formulas". On July 26, 2002, the song entered at number 46 in the French Singles Chart. The following week, it peaked at number 38. "Anticipating" spent a total of 13 weeks on the chart.

== Promotion ==
The song was performed at the Dream Within a Dream Tour. The performance began with a video interlude of Spears talking to her dancers. She then appeared onstage, wearing a patched denim skirt. The set was made of giant coloring book drawings of houses and cars. After the second chorus, she invited the audience to sing along with her. At the end of the song, she briefly talked to the audience before taking off the skirt and top to perform "I'm a Slave 4 U". Shaheem Reid of MTV noted that during the opening night of the tour in Columbus, Ohio, "Britney must've forgotten that the disco-era throwback cut was brand spanking new, because she kept encouraging everyone to sing along to the chorus [...] Although the crowd clapped and bobbed to the beat, Britney had to go this one alone vocally". The music video, directed by Marty Callner, consisted of footage of the tour performance from Britney Spears Live from Las Vegas. Several effects were added, including a glittering ball and the name of the song appearing on the screen. The song was also promoted in a commercial Spears filmed for Toyota Vios.

== Track listings ==
- CD maxi single
1. "Anticipating" – 3:16
2. "I'm Not a Girl, Not Yet a Woman" (Metro remix) – 5:25
3. "Overprotected" (Darkchild remix) – 3:20
- 12" vinyl (the French remixes)
1. "Anticipating" (remix by Alan Braxe) – 4:07
2. "Anticipating" (remix by Alan Braxe) – 1:27
3. "Anticipating" (Antoine Clamaran club mix) – 6:25
4. "Anticipating" (Antoine Clamaran instru mix) – 6:25
5. "Anticipating" (PK'Chu & RLS' sweet & sour mix) – 5:58
6. "Anticipating" (PK'Chu & RLS' hard & sexy mix) – 5:43
7. "Anticipating" (PK'Chy & RLS' hard & sexy dub mix) – 5:43

== Credits and personnel ==
Credits adapted from Britney's liner notes.

Technical

- Recorded at Rusk Sound Studios in Los Angeles, California, the DOJO in Jackson, New Jersey, Sound on Sound Studios and Battery Studios in New York City, New York.
- Mixed at Battery Studios in New York City, New York.

Personnel

- Britney Spears – lead vocals, songwriting, background vocals
- Brian Kierulf – songwriting, producer, bass guitar, bass, guitar, programming
- Josh Schwartz – songwriting, producer
- Jennifer Karr – background vocals
- Stephen George – mixing
- Nile Rodgers – guitar
- James Biondolillo – string arrangement
- Aaron Kaplan – audio engineering
- Rich Tapper – audio engineering
- Jill Tengan – audio engineering
- Charles McCrorey – audio engineering

== Charts ==
Chart performance for "Anticipating"
| Chart (2002) | Peak position |
|---|---|
| France (SNEP) | 38 |

== Sales ==
| Region | Certification | Certified units/sales |
|---|---|---|
| France | — | 23,721 |
