= Britney: The Videos =

Video by Britney Spears
- Released: November 20, 2001
- Genre: Pop
- Length: 30 minutes
- Label: Jive
- Director: Ryan Polio; Tamra Davis; Francis Lawrence; Beth McCarthy-Miller; Mike Meadows; Joe Pytka; Herb Ritts
- Producer: Ryan Polio; Kim Kaiman; Janet Kleinbaum; Ann Carli

Britney Spears chronology
Britney Spears: Live and More! (2000)	Britney: The Videos (2001)	Britney Spears Live from Las Vegas (2002)

Britney: The Videos is the third video album by American recording artist Britney Spears. It was released on DVD on November 20, 2001 through Jive Records. The video brought a collection of Spears' videos as she promoted her then-latest studio album Britney (2001).

The video album managed to enter the top 10 in the UK top 50 music videos chart list.

== Synopsis ==
Britney: The Videos is a collection of videos to promote the counterpart album Britney. It features video clips of songs from the album as well as live performances — including her 2001 MTV Video Music Awards performance — and the trailer for her film Crossroads (2002). It features a sneak peek of her much anticipated Live from Las Vegas concert, which was originally broadcast by HBO.

== Track listing ==
Britney: The Videos – North American edition
No.	Title	Length
1.	"Don't Let Me Be the Last to Know" (Music video)
2.	"I'm a Slave 4 U" (Music video)
3.	"I'm Not a Girl, Not Yet a Woman" (Music video)
4.	"I'm a Slave 4 U" (Live at the 2001 MTV Video Music Awards)
5.	"Overprotected" (includes scenes from Crossroads)
6.	"Britney Strikes a Pose"
7.	"The Making of the Movie Crossroads"
8.	"Britney's Joy of Pepsi"
9.	"HBO Presents Britney Spears: Live from Las Vegas"
10.	"Photo Gallery + Credits"
Total length:		30:00

Britney: The Videos – International edition
No.	Title	Length
1.	"Don't Let Me Be the Last to Know" (Music video)
2.	"I'm a Slave 4 U" (Live at the 2001 MTV Video Music Awards)
3.	"Britney's Joy of Pepsi"
4.	"I'm a Slave 4 U" (Music video)
5.	"Britney Strikes a Pose"
6.	"I'm Not a Girl, Not Yet a Woman" (live in Sydney)
7.	"Overprotected" (includes scenes from Crossroads)
8.	"HBO Presents Britney Spears: Live from Las Vegas"
9.	"The Making of the Movie Crossroads"
10.	"Photo Gallery + Credits"
Total length:		30:00

Notes

- "Anticipating" was used in "Britney Strikes a Pose" for background music and "Let Me Be" was used in the credits after "The Making of the Movie Crossroads", and also included a photo gallery; however, it was not listed on the track listing.
- Subtitles available in English, Spanish, Portuguese, French, German and Japanese.

== Certifications ==
Region	Certification	Certified units/sales
France (SNEP)	Platinum	20,000^{*}
United Kingdom (BPI)	Gold	25,000^{^}
United States (RIAA)	2× Platinum	200,000^{^}
^{*} Sales figures based on certification alone.^{^} Shipments figures based on certification alone.
