= Dream Within a Dream Tour =

2001–2002 concert tour by Britney Spears

- Tour by Britney Spears
- Promotional poster for the tour
- Location: Asia; North America
- Associated album: Britney
- Start date: November 1, 2001
- End date: July 28, 2002
- Legs: 3
- No. of shows: 69
- Supporting acts: O-Town; Luis Fonsi (Mexico)
- Attendance: 946,169
- Box office: US$53.3 million (Note: US$95.41 million in 2025 dollars.)

Britney Spears concert chronology
- Oops!... I Did It Again Tour (2000–2001); Dream Within a Dream Tour (2001–2002); The Onyx Hotel Tour (2004)

The Dream Within a Dream Tour (also referred to as the Britney Tour) was the fourth concert tour by American entertainer Britney Spears. It was launched in support of her third studio album, Britney (2001). The tour was promoted by Concerts West, marking the first time Spears did not tour with Clear Channel Entertainment. On September 21, 2001, a North American tour was announced that kicked off in November after various dates were postponed. In February 2002, Spears announced a second leg of the tour. It was directed and choreographed by Wade Robson, who explained the main theme of the show was Spears's coming of age and newfound independence. The stage was designed by Steve Cohen and Rob Brenner and was composed of a main stage and a B-stage, united by a runway. Inspired by Cleopatra's barge, a flying device was developed so Spears could travel over the audience to the B-stage. The setlist was mostly composed by songs from the supporting album, as Spears felt they were more reflective of her personality. Songs from her previous two studio albums were also included in remixed form by Robson.

The show was divided into seven segments with the last one being the encore. Spears opened the show hanging from a gyrating wheel; it continued with Spears performing a medley of older hits, jumping in bungee cords from the flying device onto the stage and dancing in a jungle setting. Most of the performances were accompanied by extravagant special effects, including confetti, pyrotechnics, laser lights, and artificial fog and snow. In the encore, there was a water screen that pumped two tons of water into the stage; this was considered one of the signature performances of the tour. During the 2002 leg, some changes were made; several songs were remixed, and Spears premiered various unreleased songs which included "Mystic Man". The show received acclaim from critics, who praised the show for being innovative and entertaining, while some dismissed it for taking the attention away from the music.

According to Billboard, the 2001–02 dates in North America had an average of $803,683 in gross and 14,344 in attendance. Pollstar stated that the tour had a total gross of $53.3 million and 946,169 tickets sold in 66 of 69 shows. On April 25, 2002, Spears performed at a Japanese sold-out show at Tokyo Dome in Tokyo for 62,011 fans, grossing $2,921,302. On July 27, 2002, Spears performed for 51,261 fans at Foro Sol stadium in Mexico City. The show grossed $2,251,379 and was the 37th on Pollstar's Top 200 Concert Grosses in North America. During the second show in Mexico, Spears left the stage after the sixth song due to a lightning storm; the show was canceled and angered the audience. The tour was broadcast live on an HBO special on November 18, 2001, and went on to win an Emmy for Outstanding Technical Direction on the 2002 ceremony. A DVD titled Britney Spears Live from Las Vegas was released in January 2002. In Spears' 2023 memoir The Woman in Me, she names the Dream Within a Dream Tour as her favorite tour of her entire career.

== Background ==
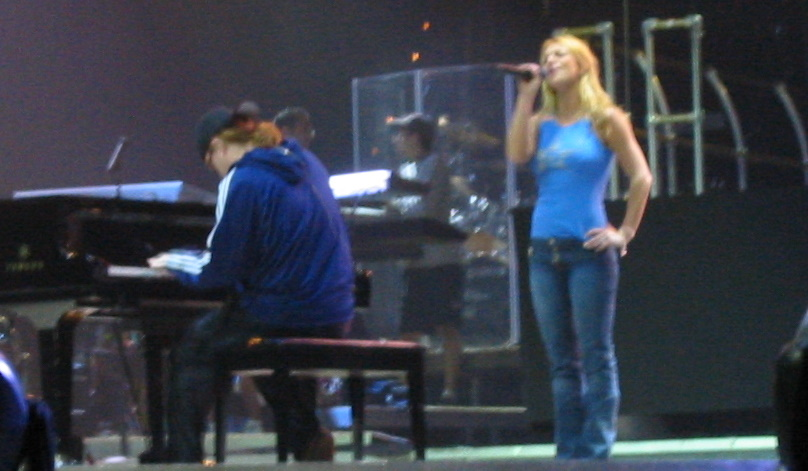
Spears at soundcheck in Oklahoma City

On July 19, 2001, Spears's band announced there would be a tour to support her third studio album, Britney (2001). The following day, Spears's label Jive Records confirmed that there was a tour planned for the fall. The Dream Within a Dream Tour was promoted by Concerts West, chosen after a much publicized battle with concert promoter Clear Channel Entertainment (CCE), who had handled her previous concert tours. It marked the first time Concerts West outbid CCE, with reports claiming Spears would earn between $13 and $15 million during the tour. Spears's manager Larry Rudolph commented on the situation, saying,

"Clear Channel is an incredible company, and I'm sure we'll be doing more business with them. We went with Concerts West because they're a strong touring company and because they have ancillary properties, in that [parent AEG owns] arenas and some 7,000 movie theaters throughout the country. This decision was not made to exclude Clear Channel. It was made to include Concerts West. [AEG] has the ability to help us market our core products—the album and tour—and our secondary properties—the movie— in ways that tipped the scale for us."

On September 20, 2001, dates were released along with the track listing of the album. The tour was slated to begin on October 26, 2001, but the opening of the show was pushed back until October 31 after Spears became ill and was prescribed five days of rest. The tour was postponed one more day due to production delays and finally kicked off at Nationwide Arena in Columbus, Ohio. Before the tour began, Spears announced she planned to give $1 of each ticket to the children of firefighters and police officers killed during the September 11 attacks. She also planned to sell merchandise and auction front row seats, hoping to raise $2 million. On February 26, 2002, more North American dates were released through her official website to kick off in Las Vegas at Mandalay Bay. The second leg of the tour was sponsored by Samsung. In conjunction with entertainment company WFX, they offered a cell-phone service that featured collectible merchandise and a membership card with access to backstage reports directly from Spears. She stated that "[the offering] is an exciting new way for me to stay connected with my fans".

== Development ==
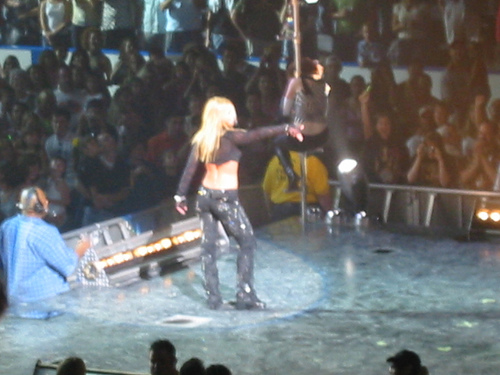
Spears performing "(You Drive Me) Crazy"

The name of the tour was based on Edgar Allan Poe's poem of the same name. The tour was directed and choreographed by Australian choreographer Wade Robson. He explained the concept of the tour, saying,

"The show is gonna be really, really theatrical—it's really complicated. It's a massive show with a lot of new music. It's just gonna be really different. [...] You're gonna learn a lot more about her as a person. The show is gonna be really about how she's becoming a woman, how she's finding herself and her independence. She knows what she wants to do, she knows who she wants to be, and that's what the show's about."

The stage was designed by production designer Steven Cohen and production manager Rob Brenner for the HBO special. This was the first time Spears used an entire new stage design after having used a typical end-stage with a ramp and stairs at the center as on her first three concert tours (the ...Baby One More Time Tour, the (You Drive Me) Crazy Tour, and the Oops!... I Did It Again Tour). Cohen designed the main stage with an oval shape so that Spears could perform around the stage and so that it would look good from multiple camera angles. He said that the rest of the stage was created with three main components in mind: a runway, a B-stage, and a flying device over the crowd. The last was developed, as explained by Cohen, "around this Cleopatra's barge concept I got into my head while designing when the movie Cleopatra was playing in the background. It needed to be elegant and stylized but also high tech, because it was going to have to be traveling on conventional motors and transport mechanisms. Plus, it had to have a big enough performance area for her and the dancers." Brenner continued, "I wanted to try to give the kid in the back of the house the same experience as the one in the first 10 rows." The runway uniting the main stage and the B-stage was suggested by one of Spears's managers, Johnny Wright. The entire stage was built by Michael Tait. Cohen said, "We took a more expanded role in preparing the drawings for Michael. We wanted to retain the essence of the look of the show, both in its overall footprint and in the execution of these various pieces. [...] [He] did a great job on executing the fine details like the hand railings and the floor lights and the MR-16 covers. When you're doing something for TV, all of those pieces are foreground pieces. The mirrors on the platforms and the floor painting made the show look better on TV."

"We had no idea the potential of the water screen, until we set it up in Lakeland, Florida [the site of the tour's rehearsals], six or seven months after we decided to put it in. There had been a lot of design and technical engineering put into it before they got back to us and said they could do it. It's actually a two-part system [...] The water screen, which is up in the air, has pumps that feed the water screen that drops down. But we needed to be able to catch the water and pump it to the other set of pumps. So that was a unique challenge for us because it had never been done before. It took us about two months to see if we could get it to work. As much experience as Steve and I both have, this was an unknown entity and we weren't quite sure what we would have to deal with. [...] [It is] one of the signature items on this tour. The first time they turned it on, Steve and I looked at each other and smiled because in our wildest dreams we never imagined it would look as good as it does. When we turn on the water, there is a hush that goes through the arena. You can almost hear them whispering to each other, ‘Is that water?’ They've seen so much to this point, and a lot of the kids at these shows are at their first concert, so the pyro, the lasers, the flying barge, and the bungee—all of these effects are new to them. It's all something they've never seen before, and just when you think it can't be outdone, we turn on the water screen".

— Rob Brenner, explaining the development of the water screen

The video screens showed both live shoots and special footage directed by Robson. Cohen worked by Danny O'Brien at BCC Video to create double-sided custom video LED cubes that hanged above stage right. There were three larger-sized video screens above the stage area. The gyrating wheel in which Spears opened the show was made by Branam Enterprises and was attached to a platform. 171 white light yag lasers were provided by Spectra. The giant music box from which Spears emerged in "Born to Make You Happy" (1999) was designed by Michael Cotton. Confetti was shot from machines provided by Pyrotek. Pyrotechnics were done by Gerb Fountains, whereas artificial snow was provided by Little Blizzard. During the encore performance of "...Baby One More Time" (1998), there was a water screen in which it was poured nearly two tons of water pumped at 360 gallons a minute. Cohen said, "The water screen is the keystone of the entire design because it impacts every system—electrics, staging, dancing. Rob discovered the company (Chameleon Productions of Orlando, Florida) that makes the screen, and I immediately looked at what they had in stock, which was a straight line. And I knew we didn't want a straight line. We wanted a circular water screen so we could physically build a shower for her to stand in the middle of and not get wet and then walk through when she wanted to. Of course, everyone thought I was crazy, so I suggested a six-sided shape. Everyone was concerned that the gaps between the sections might cause gaps in the actual sheets of water. But I kept saying that if you put them 40' to 50' up in the air, gravity will cause the water to attach to itself, so you end up getting a solid sheet."

The lighting was designed by Cohen and his partner in Steve Cohen Productions, Joel Young, who served as the tour's lighting director. Cohen continued saying, "All of our shows [are] heavily color-based—everything is rich in color. There is a lot of layering that is not confusing so the purity comes through". Young programmed the show on a Flying Pig Systems Wholehog II console, which he ran while simultaneously calling the 13 followspots for each show. There were eight truss spots and five house spots: four Lycian 2.5 kW instruments on the back, four Robert Juliats on the front truss, four FOH spots and one in the back." Steve Cohen Productions also served as the tour's lighting vendor and sublet the gear they required from Westsun and Fourth Phase/LSD. Syncrolite provided its own 3k lights. Apart from the Syncrolites, the rest of the lighting was a combination of Coemar and High End Systems automated fixtures and conventional luminaries. There were a total of 215 active lights.

A week before the tour began, Spears said of the show: "I come from Broadway, so I want it to be very theatrical. The whole process for me is magical. Hopefully it will be something people have never even imagined or envisioned in their head. I was going through a run-through yesterday and was thinking, 'By the time I'm 30, there's not going to be anything left for me to do'". Initial rehearsals for the band started on September 9, 2001. She joined them later after rehearsing the choreography in Los Angeles. The setlist was composed mostly by songs from Britney. She explained her decision in a press conference, saying, "I just want my fans to see me in a different light than they have ever seen me [in] before. This music I am singing right now is such a reflection of me and who I am. Hopefully [the fans] will come to the show and be inspired and have a lot of fun." Several songs from her previous albums ...Baby One More Time and Oops!... I Did It Again were remixed by Robson to "take [them] in a new direction – flip [them] up a bit".

== Concert synopsis ==
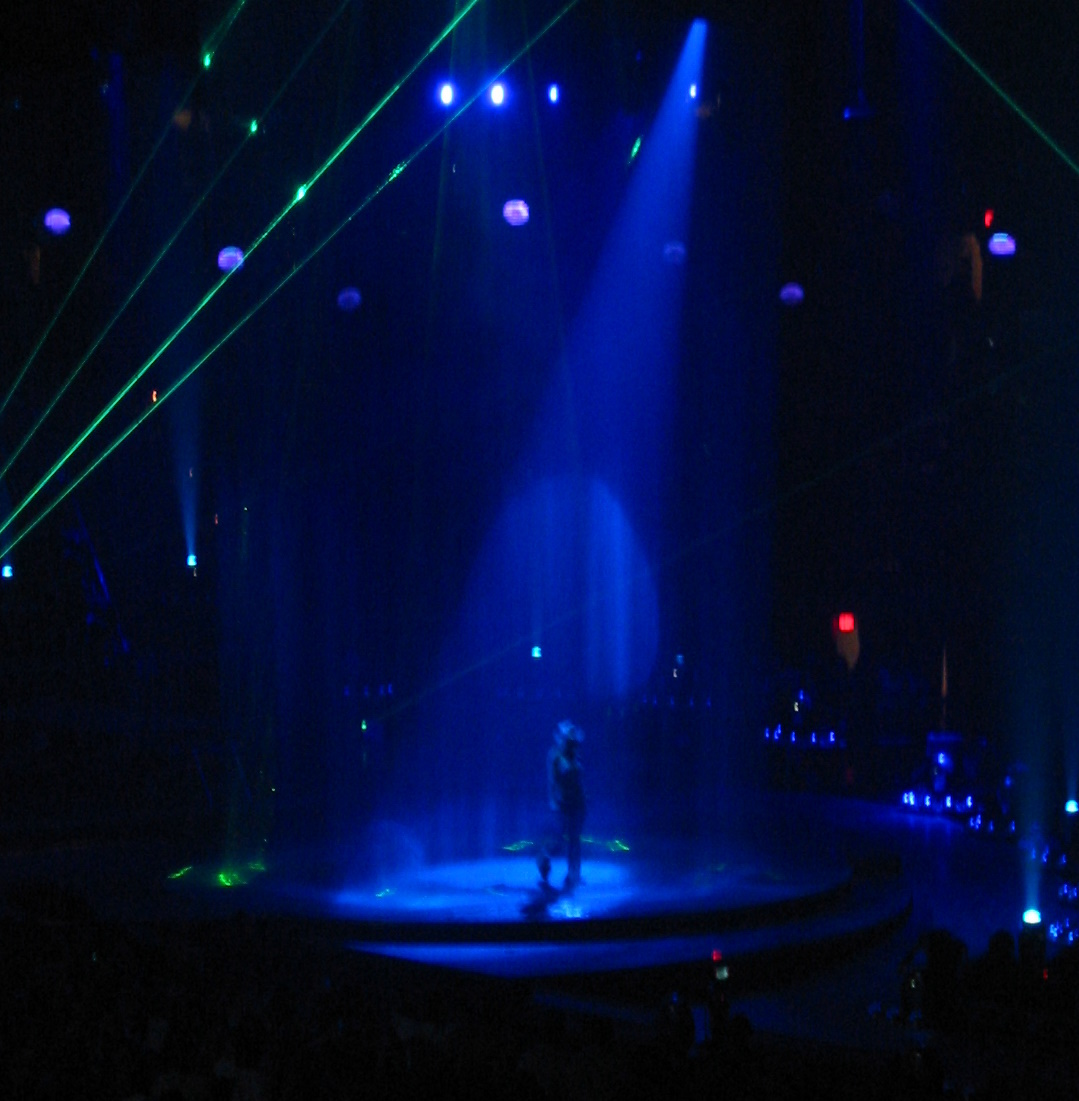
The encore performance of "...Baby One More Time", with Spears standing in the water screen

The show began with a woman dressed in an 18th-century white nightgown who talked to the audience briefly before disappearing. There was a video introduction in which different people told their dreams. At the end of the video, Spears appeared sleeping in a bubble. A platform with a wheel attached rose several feet above the ground, and she appeared strapped to it while wearing a black ensemble. She started rotating in a similar way to a target girl while starting to perform "Oops!...I Did It Again" with her dancers. "(You Drive Me) Crazy" was performed next with Spears captured by her dancers. She left the stage for a costume change while her dancers performed. "Overprotected" was performed next with Spears (dressed in a futuristic version of one of Elvis Presley's jumpsuit) surrounded by laser lights. The video backdrop showed images of a bald Spears, with her hair growing as the song went along. The next section began with an interlude of actor Jon Voight, portraying the singer's father, telling a story to a young Spears, played by Ashley Edner, before a giant musical box was raised, and Spears emerged from the middle as a ballerina to perform "Born To Make You Happy". She tore off her tutu and put on a long white satin cote to perform "Lucky" while confetti was shot. The medley ended with a performance of "Sometimes" for which she donned a bathrobe.

She returned to the stage wearing a tank top with glittery tomboy looking suspenders and pants for a dance-oriented performance of "Boys". The show continued with "Stronger", in which she wore a paint-covered robe and in some shows a bowler hat. At the end of the performance, she sat down next to a piano player and talked to the audience before moving into a performance of "I'm Not a Girl, Not Yet a Woman". A video interlude spoofing Making the Band-type shows followed, showing Spears and her dancers as a struggling band. She took the stage again in a barge (wearing a black, silver, and gray rock star style jacket and green pants) along with four female dancers to perform "I Love Rock 'n' Roll". The barge was lifted by wires, but pyrotechnics below it made it seem as if it was lifted by fire. When it was above the B-stage, Spears jumped to it with bungee cords. There was a skit in which her dancers chased her, before Spears loses the rock star jacket revealing a glittery red and purple halter top for a performance of "What It's Like To Be Me" in the small stage. She returned to the main stage for a performance of "Lonely", in which she danced to a video projection of herself. The dancers and the band performed the "Breakdown" interlude. In "Don't Let Me Be the Last to Know", she sang on an elevated platform wearing a white evening gown, while two of her dancers performed a routine. Artificial snow fell from the ceiling during the performance.

After a brief interlude, she returned for a performance of "Anticipating" where she wore a patched denim skirt. The set was made of giant coloring book drawings of houses and cars. She took out the costume to reveal a green top and small brown skirt for "I'm a Slave 4 U" in a jungle setting while surrounded by artificial fog and laser lights. After the song ended, she bowed and thanked the audience before exiting the stage. The encore began with a giant projection of a hologram of Spears onto a water screen. The projection gradually shrunk until Spears rose from the stage while wearing a plastic cowboy hat, blue hip-huggers, and a matching bra top. She began performing "...Baby One More Time" in a ballad version until reaching the end of the runway. Pyrotechnics surrounded the stage while the song changed to a more uptempo version with elements of techno. Her dancers took the main stage while she returned to it running through the runway. They jumped on the barge while it was lifted into the air and continued to dance. At the end, Spears jumped off the barge with the bungee cords and landed in the main stage and descended from it.

After the announcement of the 2002 extension of the tour, some changes were made to the setlist. The original mix of "Overprotected" was replaced by the Darkchild remix of the song. "Boys" was replaced by the remix featuring Pharrell while Spears replaced the outfit with tomboy suspenders for a black leather top. A new song called "Mystic Man" was added after "Stronger". It was described by Corey Moss of MTV as "similar to ["I'm Not a Girl, Not Yet a Woman"], but with a bit more traditional R&B flair, a la Alicia Keys". The song was often replaced with other new songs throughout the tour. Some other changes were also made; the video screens did not have such a prominent role, and the backdrops of "Overprotected" were taken out.

== Reception ==
"It was originally supposed to be one effect on the Britney Spears tour. From what people have told us, it is the premier effect, the signature effect. I've read reviews that compared it to the candelabra in Phantom or the helicopter in Miss Saigon. We're very happy to think that it is being compared to things that have been known through the years as stellar effects. We're hoping that Broadway and theatre will take a look at it and will see the validity and allow us to show them some of the things it's capable of."

— John Markham, president of Chameleon Productions, talking about the water screen in August 2002.

Larry Nager of The National Enquirer commented that "[the concert] packed more technical wizardry than Harry Potter, but almost no actual singing". He summarized his review saying "If it wasn't quite a real concert, it was a great show." Ann Powers of The New York Times said the show was "dazzling" and commented that the performance did not suffer from music being its least important element, adding "This dream extravaganza perhaps unwittingly suggested that the Britney we know is herself a dream, an artist whose genius is not for singing [...] but for teasing out the cravings and fears that haunt the modern world. Ms. Spears now wants to awaken to an adult persona, but she may find that the netherworld of desire is her natural home." Jim Farber of the New York Daily News compared it to tours of other teenage artists, saying "her latest 90-minute extravaganza had to be the costliest, most elaborate and, to be honest, least tacky to date". He was also impressed with the stage, calling it "the largest proscenium I've ever seen at a pop show." Camille Lamb of The Daily Collegian named the show "an elaborate, highly homogenized display of capitalism at its finest". She also said the show fulfilled its expectations, saying "[it brought] a teenage fantasy to a tangible reality."

Neva Chonin of the San Francisco Chronicle believed the show "was pure Britney excess, [...] hugely entertaining" and added that "while it's all too easy to deride Spears' contrivances from a distance, in person there's no denying her charisma or her archetypal appeal. She's like a refugee from David Lynch's Mulholland Drive, a gleaming dream cipher waiting to be filled with an audience's fantasies. And she works that role with flawless professionalism, punctuating her choreographed moves with an amiable accessibility that drew fans into her airtight world even as it kept them at a safe distance. In short, she connected—through smiles, giggles and what seemed to be genuine pleasure in performing." While reviewing the Femme Fatale Tour in 2011, Jim Harrington of the Oakland Tribune deemed the show as "one of the best pop music productions I've ever witnessed."

== Lubbock and Mexico cancellations ==
The show on June 14, 2002, at the United Spirit Arena in Lubbock was cancelled due to a transformer blowing out during the second song which put the whole show on auxiliary power, making it unsafe for Spears and the entire production team to continue. The show initially was going to be rescheduled according to band member and DJ, Skip, but it later fell through.

On July 28, 2002, during the second concert at Foro Sol in Mexico City, Spears left the stage after the performance of "Stronger" while saying, "I'm sorry, Mexico. I love you, bye." Shortly after, an announcement was made through the speakers confirming the show was cancelled. According to local newspapers Milenio and El Universal, fans screamed "Fraud!", booed and hurled chairs and other items. Two days later, a statement was released by Spears that said: "I'm sorry I couldn't finish the show for my fans. The Mexican fans are one of the best audiences to play for. We decided that we had no choice but to cancel the show after the storm and lightning showed no signs of clearing up." Concert promoter Ocesa Presenta director Guillermo Parra explained to El Universal that "there was no trick nor deceit, but climatic conditions cannot be controlled". It was announced that fans could receive a full refund starting on August 1, 2002. Jive Records released a statement saying,

"A hazardous lightning storm made it essential for Spears to depart the stage. Spears began the show during a break between two rainstorms, but the degree of risk to the audience and stage crew associated with the second storm, an electrical storm, made it impossible for the show to continue."

== Broadcasts and recordings ==
On March 1, 2001, prior to the actual announcement of the tour, HBO announced that a Las Vegas show at MGM Grand Arena would be broadcast on November 18, 2001. The special was directed and produced by Marty Callner. Spears requested that HBO aired the concert to the American Forces Network (AFN) on its AFN-Atlantic and AFN-Pacific channels at no cost. She also interacted with soldiers based at Marine Corps Base Camp Pendleton, Naval Base San Diego, Fort Polk, and Lackland Air Force Base. The special won an Emmy for Outstanding Technical Direction on the 2002 ceremony. In January 2002, Jive Records released the DVD Britney Spears Live from Las Vegas; it was certified two-times platinum by the Recording Industry Association of America (RIAA) for shipment of 200,000 copies in units. On September 18, 2002, Jive Records announced the release of a photographic book and DVD titled Stages and Stages: Three Days in Mexico. The DVD was directed by Albert Maysles and chronicled her stay in Mexico and Japan. Spears explained the release, saying, "I wanted to share with my fans all the things that they never get to see that make it all so special for me. It's my way of saying thank you."

== Set lists ==
=== 2001 ===
The following is from the November 1, 2001, show in Columbus. It is not intended to represent all dates throughout the tour.

1. "Dream Within a Dream" (Video Introduction)
2. "Oops!... I Did It Again"
3. "(You Drive Me) Crazy"
4. "It Was All in Your Mind" (Dance Interlude)
5. "Overprotected"
6. "Storytime" (Video Interlude) (contains elements from "From the Bottom of My Broken Heart" and "Born to Make You Happy")
7. "Born to Make You Happy"
8. "Lucky"
9. "Sometimes"
10. "Storytime (Reprise)" (Video Interlude)
11. "Boys"
12. "Stronger"
13. "I'm Not a Girl, Not Yet a Woman"
14. "Making the Band" (Video Interlude)
15. "I Love Rock 'n' Roll"
16. "What It's Like to Be Me"
17. "Lonely"
18. "Breakdown" (Performance Interlude)
19. "Don't Let Me Be the Last to Know"
20. "Crayola World" (Video Interlude)
21. "Anticipating"
22. "I'm a Slave 4 U"

Encore

23. "...Baby One More Time"
24. "It Was Just a Dream" (Video Outro)

=== 2002 ===
The following set list is from the show on May 25, 2002, show in Las Vegas. It is not intended to represent all dates throughout the tour.

1. "Dream Within a Dream" (Video Introduction)
2. "Oops!... I Did It Again"
3. "(You Drive Me) Crazy"
4. "It Was All in Your Mind" (Dance Interlude)
5. "Overprotected" (The Darkchild Remix)
6. "Storytime" (Video Interlude) (contains elements from "From the Bottom of My Broken Heart" and "Born to Make You Happy")
7. "Born to Make You Happy"
8. "Lucky"
9. "Sometimes"
10. "Storytime (Reprise)" (Video Interlude)
11. "Boys" (The Co-Ed Remix)
12. "Stronger"
13. "Mystic Man" (contains excerpts from "Gone")
14. "I'm Not a Girl, Not Yet a Woman"
15. “Making the Band" (Video Interlude)
16. "I Love Rock 'n' Roll"
17. "What It's Like to Be Me"
18. "Lonely"
19. "Breakdown" (Performance Interlude)
20. "Don't Let Me Be the Last to Know"
21. "Crayola World" (Video Interlude)
22. "Anticipating"
23. "I'm a Slave 4 U"

Encore

24. "...Baby One More Time"
25. "It Was Just a Dream" (Video Outro)

=== Notes ===
- "Weakness" replaced "Mystic Man" during shows in Vancouver, Houston, Hamilton, Worcester, and Sunrise, as well as the third Los Angeles show.
- "You Were My Home" replaced "Mystic Man" during the shows in Tacoma, Phoenix, Chicago, Bossier City, and Dallas, and the second shows in Philadelphia and Atlantic City.
- "My Love Was Always There" replaced "Mystic Man" for shows in Indianapolis, Buffalo, and Oklahoma City, as well as the second shows in Los Angeles and East Rutherford, and the third show in Boston.
- During the show in Charlotte, Spears sang "Happy Birthday" to her dancer Nancy Anderson. Additionally, "Mystic Man" was replaced by "Weakness".

== Shows ==
List of 2001 concerts, showing date, city, country, venue, opening act, tickets sold, number of available tickets and amount of gross revenue
Date	City	Country	Venue	Attendance	Revenue
November 1, 2001	Columbus	United States	Nationwide Arena	—N/a	—N/a
November 2, 2001	Pittsburgh	United States	Mellon Arena	—N/a	—N/a
November 5, 2001	Toronto	Canada	Air Canada Centre	—N/a	—N/a
November 7, 2001	Uniondale	United States	Nassau Coliseum	15,904 / 15,904	$816,871
November 8, 2001	University Park	United States	Bryce Jordan Center	—N/a	—N/a
November 9, 2001	Cleveland	United States	Gund Arena	—N/a	—N/a
November 10, 2001	Cincinnati	United States	Firstar Center	—N/a	—N/a
November 12, 2001	Denver	United States	Pepsi Center	—N/a	—N/a
November 13, 2001	Salt Lake City	United States	Delta Center	—N/a	—N/a
November 17, 2001	Las Vegas	United States	MGM Grand Garden Arena	24,638 / 24,638	$1,561,214
November 18, 2001	Las Vegas	United States	MGM Grand Garden Arena	24,638 / 24,638	$1,561,214
November 20, 2001	Anaheim	United States	Arrowhead Pond of Anaheim	—N/a	—N/a
November 21, 2001	Los Angeles	United States	Staples Center	—N/a	—N/a
November 26, 2001	Auburn Hills	United States	The Palace of Auburn Hills	16,745 / 16,745	$958,870
November 27, 2001	Milwaukee	United States	Bradley Center	—N/a	—N/a
November 28, 2001	Rosemont	United States	Allstate Arena	16,538 / 16,538	$922,038
November 29, 2001	Minneapolis	United States	Target Center	—N/a	—N/a
December 1, 2001	Atlantic City	United States	Boardwalk Hall	11,653 / 11,653	$839,588
December 2, 2001	East Rutherford	United States	Continental Airlines Arena	17,975 / 17,975	$919,880
December 3, 2001	Albany	United States	Pepsi Arena	—N/a	—N/a
December 5, 2001	New York City	United States	Madison Square Garden	16,674 / 16,674	$933,210
December 8, 2001	Hartford	United States	Hartford Civic Center	—N/a	—N/a
December 9, 2001	Boston	United States	FleetCenter	16,421 / 16,421	$947,959
December 10, 2001	Philadelphia	United States	First Union Center	18,218 / 18,218	$1,084,038
December 11, 2001	Boston	United States	FleetCenter	14,437 / 16,421	$876,588
December 14, 2001	Raleigh	United States	Raleigh Entertainment & Sports Arena	10,355 / 13,326	$601,366
December 15, 2001	Atlanta	United States	Philips Arena	15,535 / 15,535	$849,362
December 16, 2001	New Orleans	United States	New Orleans Arena	14,119 / 14,119	$711,377
December 18, 2001 (Note: The show on December 18, 2001 at the Ice Palace in Tampa was originally scheduled to take place on October 28, 2001, but was rescheduled due to Spears having the flu.)	Tampa	United States	Ice Palace	12,367 / 13,800	$638,565
December 19, 2001 (Note: The show on December 19, 2001 at the American Airlines Arena in Miami was originally scheduled to take place on October 26, 2001, but was rescheduled due to Spears having the flu.)	Miami	United States	American Airlines Arena	15,188 / 15,188	$785,991
December 21, 2001 (Note: The show on December 21, 2001 at the MCI Center in Washington, D.C. was originally scheduled to take place on October 31, 2001, but was rescheduled due to Spears having the flu.)	Washington, D.C.	United States	MCI Center	15,100 / 15,100	$779,445

List of 2002 concerts, showing date, city, country, venue, opening act, tickets sold, number of available tickets and amount of gross revenue
Date	City	Country	Venue	Attendance	Revenue
April 25, 2002	Tokyo	Japan	Tokyo Dome	62,011 / 62,011	$2,921,302
May 24, 2002	Las Vegas	United States	Mandalay Bay Events Center	18,650 / 19,724	$1,427,697
May 25, 2002	Las Vegas	United States	Mandalay Bay Events Center	18,650 / 19,724	$1,427,697
May 28, 2002	Vancouver	Canada	Pacific Coliseum	12,764 / 16,133	$727,371
May 29, 2002	Tacoma	United States	Tacoma Dome	20,733 / 20,941	$1,127,266
May 30, 2002	Portland	United States	Rose Garden	14,548 / 17,079	$806,876
June 1, 2002	Oakland	United States	The Arena in Oakland	14,221 / 14,634	$832,852
June 2, 2002	San Jose	United States	Compaq Center at San Jose	14,889 / 16,492	$843,912
June 4, 2002	Los Angeles	United States	Staples Center	30,892 / 32,392	$1,859,167
June 5, 2002	San Diego	United States	Cox Arena at Aztec Bowl	9,889 / 12,360	$655,400
June 6, 2002	Los Angeles	United States	Staples Center	— (Note: The score data is combined from the shows held at the Staples Center from June 4 and 6, 2002 respectively.)	—
June 10, 2002	Sacramento	United States	ARCO Arena	15,350 / 15,350	$847,174
June 12, 2002	Phoenix	United States	America West Arena	13,799 / 13,799	$803,930
June 14, 2002	Lubbock	United States	United Spirit Arena	14,256 / 14,256	$741,972
June 15, 2002	San Antonio	United States	Alamodome	15,769 / 17,111	$806,616
June 16, 2002	Houston	United States	Compaq Center	14,160 / 14,160	$775,828
June 20, 2002	Chicago	United States	United Center	—N/a	—N/a
June 21, 2002	Indianapolis	United States	Conseco Fieldhouse	12,834 / 15,444	$764,095
June 22, 2002	St. Louis	United States	Savvis Center	13,111 / 13,111	$822,184
June 24, 2002	Auburn Hills	United States	The Palace of Auburn Hills	14,644 / 14,644	$858,249
June 25, 2002	Hamilton	Canada	Copps Coliseum	16,241 / 16,241	$817,800
June 26, 2002	Buffalo	United States	HSBC Arena	13,862 / 13,862	$752,756
June 28, 2002	Philadelphia	United States	First Union Center	14,692 / 14,692	$911,189
June 29, 2002	Boston	United States	FleetCenter	15,396 / 15,396	$907,274
June 30, 2002	Worcester	United States	Worcester's Centrum Centre	9,458 / 10,492	$571,639
July 5, 2002	Atlantic City	United States	Boardwalk Hall	11,382 / 11,382	$588,492
July 6, 2002	East Rutherford	United States	Continental Airlines Arena	16,474 / 16,474	$870,288
July 9, 2002	Uniondale	United States	Nassau Coliseum	14,784 / 14,784	$853,326
July 10, 2002	Washington, D.C.	United States	MCI Center	11,309 / 11,309	$697,175
July 11, 2002	Charlotte	United States	Charlotte Coliseum	11,135 / 11,135	$597,854
July 13, 2002	Sunrise	United States	National Car Rental Center	11,421 / 11,421	$753,593
July 14, 2002	Orlando	United States	TD Waterhouse Centre	10,474 / 10,474	$590,200
July 18, 2002	Bossier City	United States	CenturyTel Center	12,232 / 12,232	$749,181
July 19, 2002	Oklahoma City	United States	Ford Center	16,315 / 16,315	$954,881
July 20, 2002	North Little Rock	United States	Alltel Arena	13,218 / 13,218	$718,214
July 22, 2002	Dallas	United States	American Airlines Center	15,421 / 15,421	$897,651
July 27, 2002	Mexico City	Mexico	Foro Sol	102,522 / 102,522	$4,502,758
July 28, 2002 (Note: The show on July 28, 2002 at Foro Sol in Mexico City was canceled mid-show due to a thunderstorm.)	Mexico City	Mexico	Foro Sol	102,522 / 102,522	$4,502,758
Total				880,723 / 905,266 (97.3%)	$48,582,524

== Personnel ==
- Production, set and lighting designer – Steve Cohen
- Set designer – Jim Day
- Lighting designer and director – Joel Young
- Production manager – Rob Brenner
- Show director – Wade Robson
- Tour manager – Richard Channer
- Production coordinator – Dawn Brenner
- Production assistant – Andre Morales
- Pyrotechnic and special effects designer – Doug Adams
- Master electrician – Henry Wetzel
- Head carpenter – James McKinney
- Carpenters – Dewey Evans, Barney Quinn, Mike Thonus, Curtis Gilbert, Brian Bassham, Dennis Sutton (water screen)
- Water screen technician – Bob Pratt
- Lead rigger – Mark Ward
- Advance riggers – Bill Rengstl, Bobby Savage
- Riggers – Dan Savage, Gabriel Wood, Bill Rengstl
- Branam fly riggers – James Stratton, Dave Lowman, Billy Ferrie, Joey Dickey, Bjorn Melchert
- Lighting crew chief – Pat Bannon
- Lighting technicians – Jason Bridges, Jeff Gregos, Jeff Crocker, Mike Parker, Dustin Mansell, Marcello Cacciagioni, Madison Wade, Steve Sligar
- Pyro technicians – Keith Hellebrand, Mike Green, John Taylor
- Laser technicians – John Popwycz, Gordon Hum
- Video director – Mark Haney
- Video engineer – Bob Larkin
- LED screen engineer – Kraig "Bundy" Boyd
- LED engineer/camera operator – Phil Evans
- Projectors/camera operator – Keith Lockette
- Camera operator – Adrian Brister
- Projectors – Rick Popham
- FOH sound engineer – Monty Lee Wilkes
- Monitor engineer – Raza Sufi
- Audio system engineer – James Ragus
- Audio technicians – Jamison Hyatt, Paul White, Daniel Sheehan Jr.
- Stage manager – Sven Ladewig
- Backline technicians – Marc Delcore (digital audio), Dan Weingartner (keyboards), Andy Hindman (drums and guitars – 1st leg), Brian Saunders (drums and guitars – 2nd leg)
- Stage manager assistants – Ian Donald, Chris Wallman
- Set construction – Tait Towers; Michael Tait, Winky Fairorth
- Lighting vendor – Steve Cohen Productions
- Video vendor – BCC Video; Danny O'Bryen
- Rigging vendor – Branam Enterprises; Joe Branam
- Camera track support – Tomcat USA
- Audio vendor – Showco; ML Procise
- Water screen manufacturer – Chameleon Productions; John Markham
