= Britney Spears: In the Zone =

2004 video album and EP by Britney Spears

Video / EP by Britney Spears
- Released: April 6, 2004
- Recorded: 2003–2004
- Venues: Gotham Hall; MTV Studios (New York City)
- Genres: Pop; dance-pop
- Length: 88:00
- Label: Jive
- Directors: Paul Hunter; Joseph Kahn; Chris Landon
- Producers: Lenny Bertoldo; Bloodshy & Avant; Sean Combs; Brian Kierulf; Ryan Leslie; Steven Lunt; Penelope Magnet; Linda Perry; Josh Schwartz; Trixster

Britney Spears chronology
Stages: Three Days in Mexico (2002)	Britney Spears: In the Zone (2004)	Greatest Hits: My Prerogative (2004)

Britney Spears: In the Zone is the sixth video album and first extended play (EP) by American singer Britney Spears. It was released on April 6, 2004, by Jive Records, accompanying her fourth studio album, In the Zone (2003).

Britney Spears: In the Zone contains her American Broadcasting Company (ABC) concert special of the same title, as well as footage from live performances to promote In the Zone. Its DVD also includes the accompanying music videos for "Me Against the Music" and "Toxic", while its four-track CD includes previously unreleased tracks. Upon its release, the video received mixed reviews from critics. It debuted atop the US Top Music Videos and was certified double platinum by the Recording Industry Association of America (RIAA).

== Recording and production ==
"Don't Hang Up" and "The Answer", which appeared on the North American edition of the CD of Britney Spears: In the Zone, originally appeared as bonus tracks on international editions of In the Zone (2003). Spears wrote "Don't Hang Up" along with its producers Brian Kierulf and Josh Schwartz, while "The Answer" was written and produced by Sean Combs and Ryan Leslie. The tracks were replaced by the Bloodshy & Avant-produced "I've Just Begun (Having My Fun)" and Linda Perry-written and produced "Girls and Boys" on the international edition of the video. Both were originally recorded for In the Zone but failed to make the cut. "I've Just Begun (Having My Fun)" initially appeared as a bonus digital download on the Walmart exclusive edition of In the Zone, before being included on Spears' first greatest hits album Greatest Hits: My Prerogative in November 2004.

== Release ==
In November 2003, Billboard announced that Spears planned to release a video album with previously unreleased footage in mid-March 2004. On February 26, MTV reported that the video would concentrate on the live performances to promote In the Zone (2003), such as her performances of "Me Against the Music" and "(I Got That) Boom Boom" on Total Request Live and the half-hour surprise appearance at the Palms Casino Resort's Rain Nightclub. Originally set to be released on March 23, Britney Spears: In the Zone was later pushed back to April 6, and was released as a DVD+CD set.

The DVD of Britney Spears: In the Zone also included her American Broadcasting Company (ABC) concert special of the same name, which had aired on November 17, 2003. Filmed at the Gotham Hall in New York City in October, the show featured stage settings evoking Cabaret. The video also contained the accompanying music videos for "Me Against the Music" and "Toxic", alongside the latter's episode of Making the Video. The North American edition CD included "Don't Hang Up" and "The Answer", whereas international editions included the tracks "I've Just Begun (Having My Fun)" and "Girls and Boys".

== Critical reception ==
Britney Spears: In the Zone received mixed reviews from critics. Aaron Beierle of DVD Talk highlighted the concert special, but said that the interviews and behind-the-scenes footage "are geared clearly towards promoting the album and, while they achieve that goal, they break up the momentum of the concert terribly." He summarized his review by saying: "In the Zone does disappoint somewhat with the audio, but the video quality is good. Recommended for fans."

== Accolades ==
Awards and nominations for Britney Spears: In the Zone
Year	Award	Category	Nominee(s)	Result	Ref.
2005	Japan Gold Disc Award	International Music Videos of the Year	Britney Spears: In the Zone	Won	

== Commercial performance ==
In the United States, Britney Spears: In the Zone debuted atop the US Top Music Videos chart dated April 24, 2004. On May 11, it was certified double platinum by the Recording Industry Association of America (RIAA) for shipments of 200,000 copies. Across Latin America, the video was certified platinum in Argentina and gold in Brazil and Mexico. In France, it was certified platinum by the Syndicat National de l'Édition Phonographique (SNEP), for shipments of 15,000 copies. In Australia, it was certified gold by the Australian Recording Industry Association (ARIA) for shipments of 7,500 units. In Japan, the video peaked at number seven on the Oricon video chart, spending 29 weeks charting.

== Track listing ==
Britney Spears: In the Zone – Disc one (DVD): ABC Television Special
No.	Title	Writer(s)	Length
1.	"Toxic"	Cathy Dennis; Christian Karlsson; Pontus Winnberg; Henrik Jonback	4:16
2.	"All Grown Up"		1:36
3.	"Breathe on Me"	Stephen Lee; Steve Anderson; Lisa Greene	3:58
4.	"Taking Control"		0:55
5.	"Boys" / "I'm a Slave 4 U"	Chad Hugo; Pharrell Williams	2:20
6.	"Family"		1:49
7.	"Inner Circle"		1:50
8.	"I Got That (Boom Boom)"	Roy "Royalty" Hamilton; Chyna Royal; Deongelo Holmes; Eric Jackson	4:05
9.	"The Public Eye"		2:00
10.	"Little Girl... Big Dreams"		1:39
11.	"Love & Heartbreak"		0:46
12.	"Everytime"	Britney Spears; Annet Artani	4:03
13.	"A Ride in the Park"		1:57
14.	"Britney Spears in the Zone"		0:44
15.	"...Baby One More Time"	Max Martin	2:26
16.	"Woman of the Year"		0:51
17.	"The Kiss"		1:20
18.	"Me Against the Music"	Spears; Madonna; Christopher "Tricky" Stewart; Thabiso "Tab" Nkhereanye; Penelope Magnet; Terius Nash; Gary O'Brien	4:20
Total length:			47:55

Britney Spears: In the Zone – Disc one (DVD): MTV's Total Request Live Times Square Performance
No.	Title	Writer(s)	Length
19.	"Me Against the Music"	Spears; Madonna; Stewart; Nkhereanye; Magnet; Nash; O'Brien	4:08
20.	"(I Got That) Boom Boom"	Hamilton; Royal; Holmes; Jackson	4:15
Total length:			8:23

Britney Spears: In the Zone – Disc one (DVD): Music Videos
No.	Title	Writer(s)	Director(s)	Length
21.	"Me Against the Music" (music video)	Spears; Madonna; Stewart; Nkhereanye; Magnet; Nash; O'Brien	Paul Hunter	4:02
22.	"Toxic" (MTV's Making the Video)	Dennis; Karlsson; Winnberg; Jonback	Chris Landon	17:21
23.	"Toxic" (music video)	Dennis; Karlsson; Winnberg; Jonback	Joseph Kahn	3:32
Total length:				24:55

Britney Spears: In the Zone – Disc one (DVD): In the Personal Zone
No.	Title	Length
24.	"In the Personal Zone: Exclusive Interview"	5:47
25.	"Photo Gallery"	1:24
Total length:		7:11

Britney Spears: In the Zone – North American edition disc two (CD)
No.	Title	Writer(s)	Producer(s)	Length
1.	"Don't Hang Up"	Britney Spears; Brian Kierulf; Josh Schwartz	Kierulf; Schwartz	4:03
2.	"The Answer"	Sean Combs; Ryan Leslie	Combs; Leslie	3:56
3.	"Toxic" (Lenny Bertoldo Radio Mix)	Dennis; Karlsson; Winnberg; Jonback	Bloodshy & Avant; Lenny Bertoldo^{[b]}	3:32
4.	"Me Against the Music" (Bloodshy & Avant's Chix Mix)	Spears; Stewart; Nikhereanye; Magnet; Nash; O'Brien	Trixster; Magnet^{[a]}; Bloodshy & Avant^{[b]}	5:16
Total length:				16:47

Britney Spears: In the Zone – International edition disc two (CD)
No.	Title	Writer(s)	Producer(s)	Length
1.	"(I've Just Begun) Having My Fun"	Spears; Michelle Bell; Karlsson; Winnberg; Jonback	Bloodshy & Avant; Steven Lunt	3:24
2.	"Girls and Boys"	Linda Perry	Perry	3:41
3.	"Toxic" (Lenny Bertoldo Radio Mix)	Dennis; Karlsson; Winnberg; Jonback	Bloodshy & Avant; Lenny Bertoldo^{[b]}	3:32
4.	"Me Against the Music" (Bloodshy & Avant's Chix Mix)	Spears; Stewart; Nikhereanye; Magnet; Nash; O'Brien	Trixster; Magnet^{[a]}; Bloodshy & Avant^{[b]}	5:16
Total length:				15:53

Notes

- ^{^[a]} signifies a co-producer
- ^{^[b]} signifies a remix producer

== Charts ==
Weekly chart performance for Britney Spears: In the Zone
Chart (2004)	Peak position
Dutch Music DVD (MegaCharts)	19
Italian Music DVD (FIMI)	3
Japanese Music DVD (Oricon)	7
US Music Video Sales (Billboard)	1

== Certifications ==
Certifications and sales for Britney Spears: In the Zone
Region	Certification	Certified units/sales
Argentina (CAPIF)	Platinum	8,000^{^}
Australia (ARIA)	Gold	7,500^{^}
Brazil (Pro-Música Brasil)	Gold	25,000^{*}
Mexico (AMPROFON)	Gold	10,000^{^}
United Kingdom (BPI)	Gold	25,000^{^}
United States (RIAA)	2× Platinum	200,000^{^}
^{*} Sales figures based on certification alone.^{^} Shipments figures based on certification alone.

== Release history ==
Release dates and formats for Britney Spears: In the Zone
Region	Date	Format(s)	Label(s)	Ref.
Argentina	April 2004	DVD+CD	BMG	
United States	April 6, 2004	DVD+CD	Jive	
Japan	April 21, 2004	DVD+CD	BMG Japan	
United Kingdom	May 3, 2004	DVD+CD	Jive	
France	June 18, 2004	DVD+CD	Jive	
