= Marty Callner =

American television director (1946–2025)

- Born: August 25, 1946; Chicago, Illinois, U.S.
- Died: March 17, 2025 (aged 78); Malibu, California, U.S.
- Occupation: Director
- Spouses: Jan Musarra (divorced); Aleeza Zelcer
- Children: 4
- Website: martycallner.com

Martin Henry Callner (August 25, 1946 – March 17, 2025) was an American director who made music videos, comedy specials, concert specials and television shows. He was the creator of HBO's Hard Knocks, and was nominated for numerous Primetime Emmy Awards, Directors Guild of America Awards, CableACE Awards and MTV Video Music Awards.

== Background ==
Born in Chicago on August 25, 1946, Martin Henry Callner grew up in Cincinnati, Ohio, raised primarily by his mother. He attended three universities but did not earn a degree.

== Career ==
Callner began his career at a Cincinnati television station in 1969, before moving to Boston's WBZ-TV, where he directed Boston Celtics broadcasts. He began directing stand-up specials for HBO in 1975. He moved into music videos a few years later, after being inspired by the video for the Kim Carnes song "Bette Davis Eyes". His directorial credits on music videos include videos for Aerosmith, Bon Jovi, Chaka Khan, Cher, Diana Ross, Stevie Nicks, Heart, Kiss, Poison, Ratt, Lita Ford, The Cranberries, Scorpions, Twisted Sister, Whitesnake and ZZ Top.

His music video specials include Bette Midler's Diva Las Vegas, Pat Benatar's In Concert, Britney Spears: Live from Las Vegas, Diana Ross Live at Caesar's Palace, Fleetwood Mac's Mirage Tour, Garth Brooks Live from Central Park, Gladys Knight Live at the Greek Theatre, Gloria Estefan's Caribbean Soul: The Atlantis Concert, Justin Timberlake's FutureSex/LoveShow, Marc Anthony's Concert from Madison Square Garden, Paul Simon Live at the Tower Theatre, Rolling Stones' Four Flicks, Stevie Nicks's Bella Donna, and Whitney Houston's Whitney: The Concert for a New South Africa.

He also directed recordings of performances by comedians including Redd Foxx, Pee-wee Herman, Sam Kinison, George Carlin, Robin Williams, Whoopi Goldberg, Dane Cook, John Leguizamo, Billy Crystal, George Lopez, Jerry Seinfeld, Chris Rock, Whitney Cummings, and Will Ferrell.

== Personal life and death ==
Callner and his first wife, Jan Musarra, had two children. After they divorced, he married Aleeza Zelcer, with whom he also had two children. He died at his home in Malibu, California, on March 17, 2025, at the age of 78.

== Awards and nominations ==
Year	Award	Category	Work	Result	Ref.
1979	CableACE Awards	Entertainment	On Location	Nominated	
1979	CableACE Awards	Entertainment	Standing Room Only	Won	
1981	CableACE Awards	Single Program – General Entertainment or Variety: Music	Standing Room Only	Won	
1981	CableACE Awards	Single Program – General Entertainment or Variety: Unclassified	Standing Room Only	Nominated	
1983	CableACE Awards	Directing a Theatrical-Music Program	Camelot	Nominated	
1995	CableACE Awards	Music Special	Madonna: The Girlie Show – Live Down Under	Nominated	
1999	Directors Guild of America Awards	Outstanding Directorial Achievement in Musical/Variety	Jerry Seinfeld: I'm Telling You for the Last Time	Nominated	
2003	Directors Guild of America Awards	Outstanding Directorial Achievement in Musical/Variety	Robin Williams: Live on Broadway	Nominated	
2004	Directors Guild of America Awards	Outstanding Directorial Achievement in Musical/Variety	Rolling Stones: Forty Licks World Tour Live at Madison Square Garden	Nominated	
1994	MTV Video Music Awards	Best Direction in a Video	"Amazing" – Aerosmith	Nominated	
1991	Primetime Emmy Awards	Outstanding Lighting Direction (Electronic) for a Drama Series, Variety Series, Miniseries or a Special	Cher... at the Mirage	Nominated	
1997	Primetime Emmy Awards	Outstanding Variety, Music or Comedy Special	Diva Las Vegas	Nominated	
1997	Primetime Emmy Awards	Outstanding Directing for a Variety or Music Program	Diva Las Vegas	Nominated	
1998	Primetime Emmy Awards	Outstanding Directing for a Variety or Music Program	Garth: Live from Central Park	Nominated	
1999	Primetime Emmy Awards	Outstanding Variety, Music or Comedy Special	Jerry Seinfeld: I'm Telling You for the Last Time	Nominated	
2003	Primetime Emmy Awards	Outstanding Variety, Music or Comedy Special	Robin Williams: Live on Broadway	Nominated	
2003	Primetime Emmy Awards	Outstanding Variety, Music or Comedy Special	Rolling Stones: Forty Licks World Tour Live at Madison Square Garden	Nominated	
2009	Primetime Emmy Awards	Outstanding Variety, Music or Comedy Special	Chris Rock: Kill the Messenger	Nominated	
2009	Primetime Emmy Awards	Outstanding Variety, Music or Comedy Special	Will Ferrell: You're Welcome America. A Final Night with George W. Bush	Nominated	
2009	Primetime Emmy Awards	Outstanding Directing for a Variety, Music or Comedy Special	Will Ferrell: You're Welcome America. A Final Night with George W. Bush	Nominated	
2010	Primetime Emmy Awards	Outstanding Variety, Music or Comedy Special	Robin Williams: Weapons of Self Destruction	Nominated	
2011	Primetime Emmy Awards	Outstanding Variety, Music or Comedy Special	The Pee-wee Herman Show on Broadway	Nominated	
