= Stronger (Britney Spears song) =

2000 single by Britney Spears

Single by Britney Spears

from the album Oops!... I Did It Again
- B-side: "Walk On By"
- Released: October 31, 2000
- Recorded: November 1999
- Studio: Cheiron Studios (Stockholm, Sweden)
- Genre: Dance-pop; synth-pop; teen pop
- Length: 3:23
- Label: Jive
- Songwriters: Max Martin; Rami
- Producers: Max Martin; Rami

Britney Spears singles chronology
"Lucky" (2000)	"Stronger" (2000)	"Don't Let Me Be the Last to Know" (2001)

Music video
- "Stronger" on YouTube

"Stronger" is a song by American singer Britney Spears from her second studio album, Oops!... I Did It Again (2000). It was released on October 31, 2000, by Jive Records as the third single from the album. After meeting with producers Max Martin and Rami in Sweden, Spears recorded several songs for the album, including "Stronger". The dance-pop, synth-pop and teen pop song features self-empowerment lyrics about a girl who is tired of her cheating boyfriend and decides to move on without him. It received acclaim from music critics, who described the song as being both musically and lyrically innovative, with some deeming it the best track on Oops!... I Did It Again.

"Stronger" was a global success, reaching the top five in Austria, Germany and Sweden, while reaching the top ten in Finland, Ireland, Switzerland and United Kingdom. "Stronger" peaked at number 11 in the United States' Billboard Hot 100, and was later certified platinum by the Recording Industry Association of America (RIAA), for selling over 1,000,000 units of the single. An accompanying music video was directed by Joseph Kahn, who considered it as a thematic departure from Spears' previous music videos. The music video received a nomination on the 2001 MTV Video Music Awards for Best Pop Video.

Spears has performed "Stronger" in a number of live appearances, including at the Radio Music Awards of 2000, American Music Awards of 2001, a Fox special titled Britney Spears: There's No Place Like Home, and in two of her concert tours, the Oops!... I Did It Again Tour (2000) and the Dream Within a Dream Tour (2001–2002). In 2013, Spears performed the song for the first time in eleven years on her Las Vegas residency concert Britney: Piece of Me (2013–2017). She also performed it at the Britney: Live in Concert (2017) and the Piece of Me Tour (2018). In 2010, "Stronger" was covered by actor Kevin McHale for an episode of TV series Glee titled "Britney/Brittany". The cover received positive reviews from contemporary music critics. In 2023, "Stronger" was ranked at number 37 on Rolling Stone's "The 50 Most Inspirational LGBTQ Songs of All Time" list.

== Background and composition ==
"Stronger"
A 20 second sample of the song's chorus, which features Spears singing self-empowerment lyrics over an innovative dance beat and dance-pop background.

In 1999, Britney Spears began work on her second studio album Oops!...I Did It Again (2000), in Sweden and Switzerland. After meeting with Max Martin and Rami Yacoub in Sweden, Spears recorded several songs for the album, including "Stronger", which was co-written and co-produced by Martin and Rami. Upon returning to the United States, the singer revealed in an interview with MTV News that: "I just got back from Sweden, and did half [of] the material [for Oops!] over there. I was really, really happy with the material, but we had [such] limited time to get so much done. So I've just really been in the studio nonstop, which is cool, though." Spears recorded her vocals for the song in November 1999 at Cheiron Studios in Stockholm, Sweden. In Austria, "Stronger" was released on November 13, 2000, as the third single from the album.

"Stronger" is a teen pop and dance-pop song that features a heavy dance beat, and lasts 3 minutes and 23 seconds. According to the digital music sheet published at Musicnotes.com, the song is composed in the key of G-sharp minor and is set in time signature of common time with a tempo of 108 beats per minute, while Spears vocal range spans from C♯_{3} to C♯_{5}. Music critics noticed the song as Spears' declaration of independence, which is perceived in self-empowerment lines such as "I'm not your property" and "I don't need nobody". Its lyrics also quote Spears' iconic debut hit "...Baby One More Time", which was also co-written and produced for Spears by Martin and Yacoub and released two years earlier; the latter's famous chorus, "My loneliness is killing me", is answered in "Stronger" with the lyric, "My loneliness ain't killin' me no more". Despite not being written by the singer, it was speculated that the song is directed to the singer's record label Jive Records and her management. In a review for the album, David Browne of Entertainment Weekly noted that "Stronger" together with "Don't Go Knockin' on My Door" is reminiscent of the Rolling Stones' "The Last Time" (1965).

== Critical response ==
"Stronger" received acclaim from music critics. Stephanie McGrath of Jam! considered the song "the best dance track" of Oops!, deeming the song "every bit as good as *Nsync's 'Bye, Bye, Bye' or The Backstreet Boys' 'The One'." Tracy E. Hopkins of Barnes & Noble, while reviewing the album, said, "Spears shines on the tongue-in-cheek lead single, the triumphant 'Stronger'..." David Veitch of the Calgary Sun considered "Stronger" to be as "another boom-bastic upbeat track", while saying the song is "notable for its foghorn synth, fabulous rhythm track and heavy effects applied to Britney's voice. Why she's panting at the end of the bridge is anybody's guess." A review by the NME staff compared "Stronger" to songs recorded by ABBA, saying, "there's the deranged helium synth pop of 'Stronger' with the huge ABBA chord change in the chorus that sounds scarier and more robotic than the Backstreet Boys." Andy Battaglia from Salon said "Stronger" "could crush the entire self-help industry with its melody alone." Digital Spy's Alim Kheraj pointed out the "deeper element of defiance embedded both within the lyrics and the epic chord progressions".

Writing for Pink News, Mayer Nissim deemed it "a perfect pop masterpiece". For Alex Macpherson from The Guardian, it's one of the best examples of Spears' "distressing vulnerability" as well as her second best song; "for the first but by no means last time, Britney embraces the inhuman qualities of her strange, hiccupping voice with vocals distorted and ground up against the beat". Shannon Barbour from Cosmopolitan opined that it was "proof that Empowered Britney is the best Britney". Similarly, Gay Times' Daniel Megarry called it "an empowering gay club favourite". Entertainment Weekly ranked it at number 14 on their ranking of Spears' songs; "['Stronger'] foretold the future, both lyrically (she vowed to do things 'my way') and sonically (the stormy electronic touches hinted at a shift in her Scandi-pop sound). Today, it's the theme song for her resilience". Rolling Stone hailed it "a dance pop anthem of self-empowerment that is both obviously autobiographical and highly relatable to anyone eager to define themselves as a young adult". Caryn Ganz from Spin said that "Britney's first self-empowerment anthem is still her best: a strutting finger-wagger that's somehow also a fist-pumper".

== Chart performance ==
In the United States, "Stronger" entered the top 40 of the Billboard Hot 100 at number 29 on December 30, 2000. It later peaked at number 11. It also peaked at number 17 on the Billboard Top 40 Mainstream chart. It was also certified gold by the Recording Industry Association of America (RIAA). "Stronger" also peaked at number two on the Hot Dance Music/Maxi-Singles Sales component chart, and number 37 on Rhythmic Top 40. As of June 2012, "Stronger" has sold 415,000 physical units, with 270,000 paid digital downloads in the United States. It is Spears' third best-selling physical single in the country.

"Stronger" also achieved commercial success worldwide, reaching number one in Mexico and was the number-one best-selling single in 2001, and reaching number four in Austria and Sweden, six in Ireland and Switzerland, and eight in Finland, while reaching the top 20 in several European countries. On the week of December 16, 2000, "Stronger" debuted at number seven in The Official Charts Company from the United Kingdom, falling to number 11 in the following week, her first single not to reach the top five there. In Australia, the song peaked at number 13, and was later certified platinum by the Australian Recording Industry Association (ARIA), for shipments of more than 70,000 units of the single. In France, "Stronger" reached number 20, making it the lowest chart position for the song worldwide. However, it was certified gold by the Syndicat National de l'Édition Phonographique (SNEP), for selling over 250,000 units of the single. In Germany, the song reached number four on the Media Control Charts, being certified gold by the Bundesverband Musikindustrie (BVMI) for shipping over 250,000 units of the single.

== Music video ==
Throughout the video for "Stronger", Spears is seen performing while dancing with a chair; these sequences were inspired by Janet Jackson's "The Pleasure Principle" and "Miss You Much" music videos.

The music video for "Stronger" was shot on October 5–7, 2000 at Syncro Aviation Hangar at Van Nuys Airport, Los Angeles, and directed by Joseph Kahn. Kahn revealed that the concept for the music video was created by Spears herself, by saying "I would like to dance in a chair and drive in a car and break up with [my] boyfriend. [...] Those are your three elements." Kahn ended up creating, according to Jocelyn Vena of MTV, "a semi-futuristic world in which Spears walks into a club, breaks up with her cheating boyfriend and triumphantly walks in the rain, knowing her life is better off without him." Kahn also considered the music video as very sophisticated, saying that it is "definitely a departure from the sort of candy-colored videos she was doing before, so I always thought this was the transition between Britney the teenage pop star and Britney the sort of diva she became." Kahn revealed that Spears' referenced Janet Jackson's "The Pleasure Principle" and "Miss You Much" music videos for the video's chair routine, saying her idea was inspired by "Janet Jackson's 'Pleasure Principle' — the iconic chair sequence in that". A review of the video also commented "Ms. Spears gives us her best Janet Jackson impression ("Miss You Much") with a dizzying chair-dance routine." Spears also referenced and draws inspiration from Jackson in several other music videos, including "Don't Let Me Be the Last to Know".

The video premiered on MTV's Making the Video on November 3, 2000, at 4:30PM ET. An alternate footage can be found on the DVD of Spears' first compilation album, Greatest Hits: My Prerogative (2004). It begins with a closed caption that reads "Britney Spears – Stronger", amidst the sound of a storm. It then cuts to a close up of Spears looking at her boyfriend, who is smiling with another woman (played by Angela Sarafyan) holding him. She realizes she is better without him and walks away, after saying, "Whatever", to the audience. There is a shot of the tower hotel they are in, in an apparent semi-futuristic world, having a party in the restaurant in the hotel tower at the top, and then the hotel tower explodes and blows up. At the beginning of the first verse, Spears starts dancing with an Emeco 1006-style chair in front of a black background.

The second half of the video finds Spears driving away from the party in a classic Ford Mustang car during a thunderstorm; however, before long, her car goes into a spin out after she swerves to avoid a chair tossed in front of her from the storm, then stops on the very edge of the bridge. After recovering from the shock of it, she is forced to continue walking on in the rain. Cuts of her dancing with a cane, transformed from the chair, are also included. The video ends with Spears walking across a bridge. Two versions of the video exist, one in which Spears stands in mid-air above the spinning chair during the bridge alongside additional brief choreography shots during the first chorus, and the other replacing the footage with a close-up of her singing. Nuzhat Naoreen of MTV praised the music video, saying, "few performers can work an entire routine on and around a chair as well as Britney did in 'Stronger'". The music video received a nomination on the 2001 MTV Video Music Awards for Best Pop Video.

== Live performances and covers ==
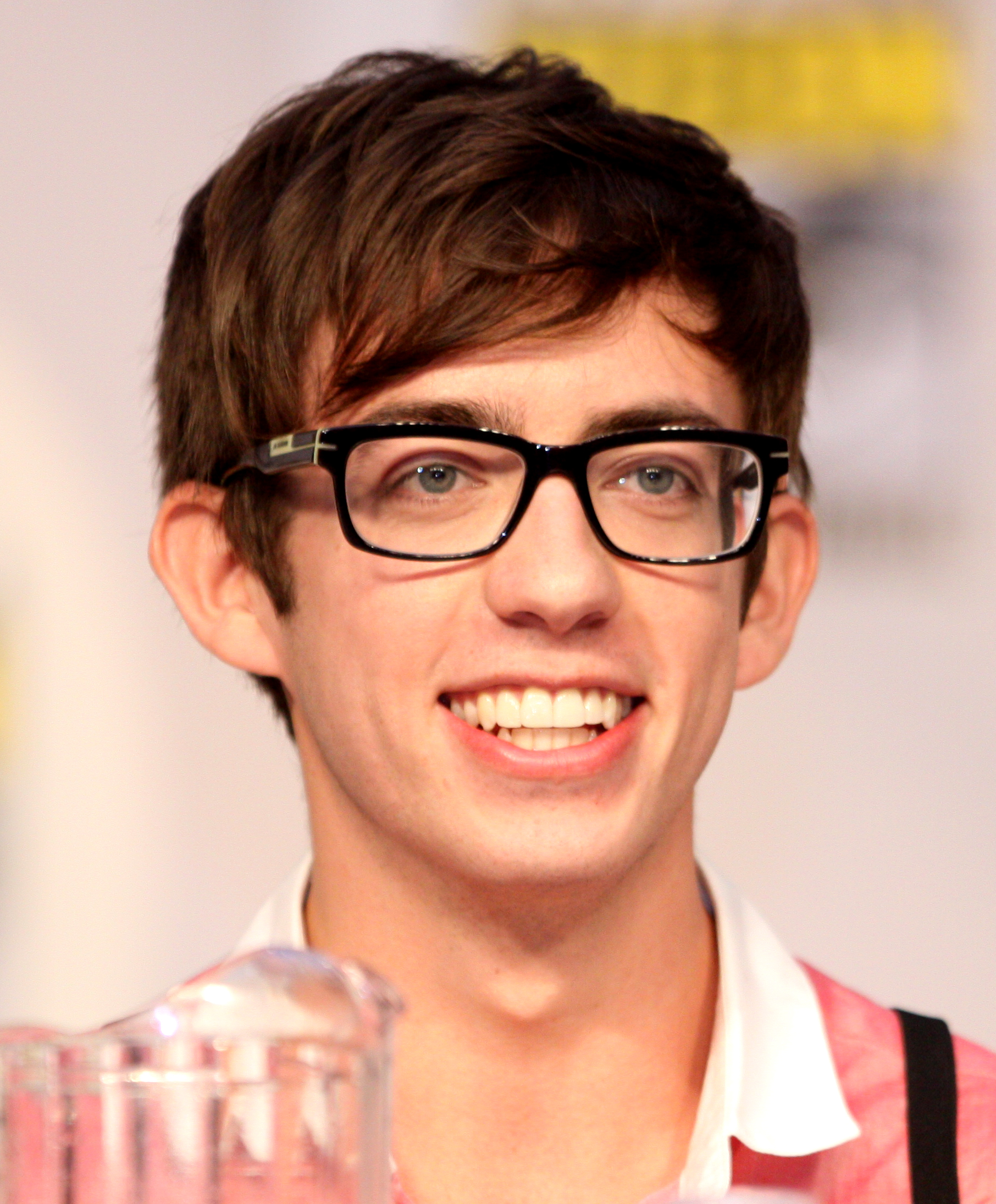
Kevin McHale (pictured) covered the song for an episode of Glee

Spears performed "Stronger" for the first time during her Oops!... I Did It Again Tour in Columbia, U.S., on June 20, 2000. The show began with the video introduction "The Britney Spears Experience", in which three images of Spears welcomed spectators to the show. Then, a giant metal orb was lowered onstage and lifted again to reveal Spears standing behind it. Wearing a glittery jeans and an orange halter top, she opened the show with a dance-oriented performance of the song. "Stronger" was performed on 2002's Dream Within a Dream Tour. After a dance-oriented performance of "Boys", Spears performed the song, in which she wore a paint-covered robe and in some shows a bowler hat. Spears also performed the song on several television appearances, including on the American Music Awards of 2001, and on a MTV special titled Total Britney Live. A Fox special titled Britney Spears in Hawaii, aired on June 8, 2000, included an exclusive performance of the song. A performance of "Stronger" live from Germany was broadcast on Radio Music Awards of 2000, since Spears was on tour by the time of the awards. "Stronger" was later included on the set list of Spears' Las Vegas residency show Britney: Piece of Me.

"Stronger" was covered by Kevin McHale on TV series Glee, on a 2010 second season episode titled "Britney/Brittany", that was dedicated to the singer. In the episode, McHale's character Artie Abrams has a hallucination of himself singing "Stronger" during a dental visit. The cover was released on the soundtrack album Glee: The Music, Volume 4 and received positive reviews from contemporary music critics. Raymund Flandez of The Wall Street Journal enjoyed the cover version, appreciating the twist of having males sing a feminist empowerment song, while Tim Stack of Entertainment Weekly deemed "Stronger" his favorite performance of the episode, as well as the best incorporation of Spears' music, as the song served Artie's storyline.

== Track listings ==
- European CD single
1. "Stronger" (Album Version) – 3:23
2. "Walk On By" – 3:34
- European, Australian and Japanese CD maxi single
1. "Stronger" (Album Version) – 3:23
2. "Stronger" (Instrumental) – 3:23
3. "Walk On By" – 3:34
4. "Stronger" (Miguel Migs Vocal Edit) – 3:41
- French CD maxi single
1. "Stronger" (Album Version) – 3:23
2. "Walk On By" – 3:34
3. "Stronger" (Miguel Migs Vocal Edit) – 3:41
- UK CD maxi single
1. "Stronger" (Album Version) – 3:23
2. "Walk On By" – 3:34
3. "Stronger" (WIP Remix) – 5:50
- US CD single
1. "Stronger" (Album Version) – 3:23
2. "Stronger" (Pablo La Rosa's Tranceformation Edit) – 3:28
- UK cassette single
1. "Stronger" (Album Version) – 3:23
2. "Walk On By" – 3:34
3. "Stronger" (Instrumental) – 3:23
- US 12-inch vinyl
1. "Stronger" (Pablo La Rosa's Tranceformation) – 7:21
2. "Stronger" (Pimp Juice's Extra Strength Dub) – 7:05
3. "Stronger" (Miguel 'Migs' Vocal Mix) – 6:31
4. "Stronger" (Miguel 'Migs' Dub) – 6:54
- US maxi single – The Remixes
1. "Stronger" (Album Version) – 3:23
2. "Stronger" (Mac Quayle Club Mix) – 7:50
3. "Stronger" (Pablo La Rosa's Tranceformation) – 7:21
4. "Stronger" (Miguel 'Migs' Vocal Mix) – 6:31
5. "Stronger" (Jack D. Elliot Club Mix) – 6:38
6. "Stronger" (Pimp Juice's "Ain't No Shame in This Vocal Mix Game" Mix) – 5:50
- 2025 Digital Single
1. "Stronger" (Album Version) – 3:24
2. "Stronger" (Mac Quayle Club Mix) – 7:53
3. "Stronger" (Mac Quayle Mix Show Edit) – 5:20
4. "Stronger" (Pablo La Rosa's Tranceformation) – 7:24
5. "Stronger" (Pablo La Rosa's Tranceformation Radio Edit) – 3:28
6. "Stronger" (Miguel 'Migs' Vocal Mix) – 6:32
7. "Stronger" (Miguel 'Migs' Dub) – 6:55
8. "Stronger" (Miguel 'Migs' Vocal Edit) – 3:41
9. "Stronger" (Pimp Juice's "Ain't No Shame in This Vocal Mix Game" Mix) – 5:50
10. "Stronger" (Pimp Juice's Extra Strength Dub) – 7:06
11. "Stronger" (Jack D. Elliot Club Mix) – 6:40
12. "Stronger" (Jack D. Elliot Radio Mix) – 3:33
13. "Stronger" (Instrumental) – 3:26

== Credits and personnel ==
- Britney Spears – lead vocals, background vocals
- Max Martin – production, songwriting, audio mixing, keyboards, programming, background vocals
- Rami Yacoub – production, songwriting, keyboards
- Nana Hedin – background vocals
- John Amatiello – Pro Tools engineering
- Tom Coyne – audio mastering

== Charts ==
=== Weekly charts ===
Weekly chart performance
Chart (2000–2001)	Peak position
Australia (ARIA)	13
Australian Dance (ARIA)	5
Austria (Ö3 Austria Top 40)	4
Belgium (Ultratop 50 Flanders)	15
Belgium (Ultratop 50 Wallonia)	14
Canada Top Singles (RPM)	41 (Note: "Stronger" reached number 41 when RPM ceased publication in November 2000.)
Denmark (Tracklisten)	12
Eurochart Hot 100 (Music & Media)	3
Europe (European Radio Top 50)	6
Finland (Suomen virallinen lista)	8
France (SNEP)	20
Germany (GfK)	4
Greece (IFPI)	8
Guatemala (Notimex)	2
Hungary (MAHASZ)	2
Iceland (Íslenski Listinn Topp 40)	9
Ireland (IRMA)	6
Italy (FIMI)	14
Netherlands (Dutch Top 40)	14
Netherlands (Single Top 100)	12
New Zealand (Recorded Music NZ)	15
Norway (VG-lista)	11
Poland Airplay (Music & Media)	1
Poland (Polish Airplay Charts)	4
Portugal (AFP)	9
Romania (Romanian Top 100)	9
Scottish Singles Sales (Official Charts)	6
Spain (Promusicae)	15
Sweden (Sverigetopplistan)	4
Switzerland (Schweizer Hitparade)	6
UK Singles (Official Charts)	7
UK Indie (Official Charts)	3
US Billboard Hot 100	11
US Dance Singles Sales (Billboard)	2
US Pop Airplay (Billboard)	17
US Rhythmic Airplay (Billboard)	37

Weekly chart performance
Chart (2021)	Peak position
Hungary (Single Top 40)	26
Malaysia (RIM)	14
UK Singles Downloads (Official Charts)	55

=== Year-end charts ===
Year-end chart performance
Chart (2000)	Position
Australia (ARIA)	85
Ireland (IRMA)	71
Sweden (Hitlistan)	46
UK Singles (OCC)	123

Year-end chart performance
Chart (2001)	Position
Austria (Ö3 Austria Top 40)	41
Eurochart Hot 100 (Music & Media)	42
Europe (European Radio Top 100)	41
Romania (Romanian Top 100)	90
Switzerland (Schweizer Hitparade)	90
US Mainstream Top 40 (Billboard)	86
US Maxi-Singles Sales (Billboard)	7

== Certifications ==
Certifications
Region	Certification	Certified units/sales
Australia (ARIA)	Gold	35,000^{^}
Canada (Music Canada)	Gold	40,000^{‡}
Denmark (IFPI Danmark)	Gold	4,000^{^}
France (SNEP)	Gold	250,000^{*}
Germany (BVMI)	Gold	250,000^{^}
New Zealand (RMNZ)	Gold	15,000^{‡}
Sweden (GLF)	Gold	15,000^{^}
United Kingdom (BPI)	Gold	400,000^{‡}
United States (RIAA)	Platinum	1,000,000^{‡}
^{*} Sales figures based on certification alone.^{^} Shipments figures based on certification alone.^{‡} Sales+streaming figures based on certification alone.

== Release history ==
Release dates and formats for "Stronger"
Region	Date	Format(s)	Label(s)	Ref.
United States	October 31, 2000	Contemporary hit radio	Jive	
France	November 7, 2000	Maxi CD	Jive	
Germany	November 13, 2000	Maxi CD	Rough Trade	
France	November 21, 2000	CD	Jive	
United Kingdom	December 4, 2000	Cassette; maxi CD	Jive	
Japan	December 6, 2000	Maxi CD	Zomba	
United States	December 12, 2000	12-inch vinyl; maxi CD	Jive	
United States	January 2, 2001	CD	Jive	

== Bibliography ==
- Mitchell, Claudia; Reid-Walsh, Jacqueline (2000). Girl Culture: Studying girl culture: a readers' guide. Abc-Clio. ISBN 9780313339097.
