= Britney (album) =

Studio album by Britney Spears
- Released: October 31, 2001
- Recorded: February–July 2001
- Studios: 2nd Floor (Orlando); Battery (New York City); Hit Factory Criteria (Miami); Jailhouse (Horsens); Maratone (Stockholm); Master Sound (Virginia Beach); Record Plant (Los Angeles); Right Track (New York City); Rusk Sound (Los Angeles); Sound on Sound (New York City); Sterling Sound (New York City); The DOJO (Jackson); The Hit Factory (New York City); Westlake (Los Angeles)
- Genres: Pop; R&B
- Length: 39:47
- Label: Jive
- Producers: BT; Rodney Jerkins; Brian Kierulf; Peter Kvint; Max Martin; The Neptunes; Rami; Josh Schwartz; Justin Timberlake

Britney Spears chronology
Oops!... I Did It Again (2000)	Britney (2001)	In the Zone (2003)

Singles from Britney
- 1. "I'm a Slave 4 U" Released: September 24, 2001; 2. "Overprotected" Released: December 10, 2001; 3. "I'm Not a Girl, Not Yet a Woman" Released: January 7, 2002; 4. "I Love Rock 'n' Roll" Released: May 27, 2002; 5. "Boys" Released: June 24, 2002; 6. "Anticipating" Released: June 25, 2002

Britney is the third studio album by American singer Britney Spears. It was released on October 31, 2001, by Jive Records. Looking to transition from the teen pop styles of her first two studio albums ...Baby One More Time (1999) and Oops!... I Did It Again (2000), Spears began to embrace a significantly more mature sound with Britney.

The record incorporates genres of pop and R&B with influences of EDM and occasionally dips into disco, hip-hop, rock, and electronica. Its lyrical themes address the subjects such as coming of age, adulthood, control, and sexuality. Contributions to its production came from a variety of collaborators, including Max Martin and Rami Yacoub. Spears herself assumed a more prominent role in the album's development, co-writing six of its tracks. The album correlated with Spears's feature film Crossroads (2002), in which three tracks from the album were featured.

Britney received generally mixed reviews from music critics, who complimented Spears' musical progression but criticized her increasingly provocative image. The album was a global commercial success and debuted atop the US Billboard 200 with first-week sales of 746,000 copies, making Spears the first female artist to have her first three studio albums debut atop the chart, a record she would extend with her fourth studio album In the Zone (2003). The album received a nomination for Best Pop Vocal Album at the 45th Annual Grammy Awards (2003). With worldwide sales of over 10 million copies, Britney is one of the best-selling albums of the 21st century.

Britney produced six singles. "I'm a Slave 4 U", the lead single, reached the top ten in 20 countries. "Overprotected" also achieved international commercial success. (Note: In the United States, the Darkchild remix of "Overprotected" was released as the third single from Britney instead of the original version, hence the remix charted on the US Billboard Hot 100. Elsewhere, the original version had been released as the second single.) "I'm Not a Girl, Not Yet a Woman", "I Love Rock 'n' Roll" and "Boys" reached the top ten in several countries but all failed to enter the US Billboard Hot 100, (Note: "I Love Rock 'n' Roll" was never released as a single in the US, hence it could not chart. "I'm Not a Girl, Not Yet a Woman" and "Boys" peaked at numbers two and 22, respectively, on the US Bubbling Under Hot 100 Singles, which acts as a 25-position extension to the Billboard Hot 100.) while "Anticipating" was released exclusively in France instead of "I Love Rock 'n' Roll". To further promote the album, Spears embarked on her fourth concert tour, titled Dream Within a Dream Tour, from November 2001 until July 2002. The 25th anniversary edition of the album was released on November 6, 2026.

== Recording and production ==
"This is the first album I have ever really written and taken my time on, so when I actually listen to the whole album, it's just that much more special. I don't know if I'm the best songwriter in the world, but I had a lot of fun doing it and hopefully I will get better and grow."

— Spears talks about her songwriting experience for Britney

For her second studio album Oops!... I Did It Again, which was released in May 2000 to global commercial success, Spears collaborated with producers such as Darkchild, Rami Yacoub, and Max Martin; all of them returned for Britney. Spears additionally worked with a variety of collaborators, including her then-boyfriend Justin Timberlake. She commented that she initially felt "awkward" and "nervous" working with Timberlake, saying that she was accustomed to the process being "like work". For the first time, Spears worked with hip-hop producers the Neptunes. She claimed to have been inspired by "a lot of hip-hop and R&B while I was on my last tour. I was inspired by Jay-Z and the Neptunes. I told Jive I really wanted to work with [the Neptunes]. I wanted to make [Britney] nastier and funkier." Spears was additionally set to record songs with Missy Elliott and Timbaland, which never came to fruition due to scheduling conflicts.

While recording Britney, Spears wanted an "older generation to pick up on it", adding that she "had to change it up and pray people think that's cool". She stated that she chose to self-title the album because the majority of its content described herself. Spears recorded 23 tracks for the album, several of which she co-wrote with the assistance of Brian Kierulf and Josh Schwartz. She added that personally writing the album and developing its concept made the project "that much more special", elaborating of her intentions to "get better and grow" as a songwriter. During the sessions, Spears also worked with electronic musician BT, whose tracks were excluded from the standard edition track listing. She stated: "I was really disappointed we weren't able to use the tracks BT had done. He's a genius in whatever he does, but the type of music he ended up doing didn't fit me and what I was going for. I think they will be on some of the stuff [released] overseas." His contribution "Before the Goodbye" was included on international editions of the album.

== Music and lyrics ==
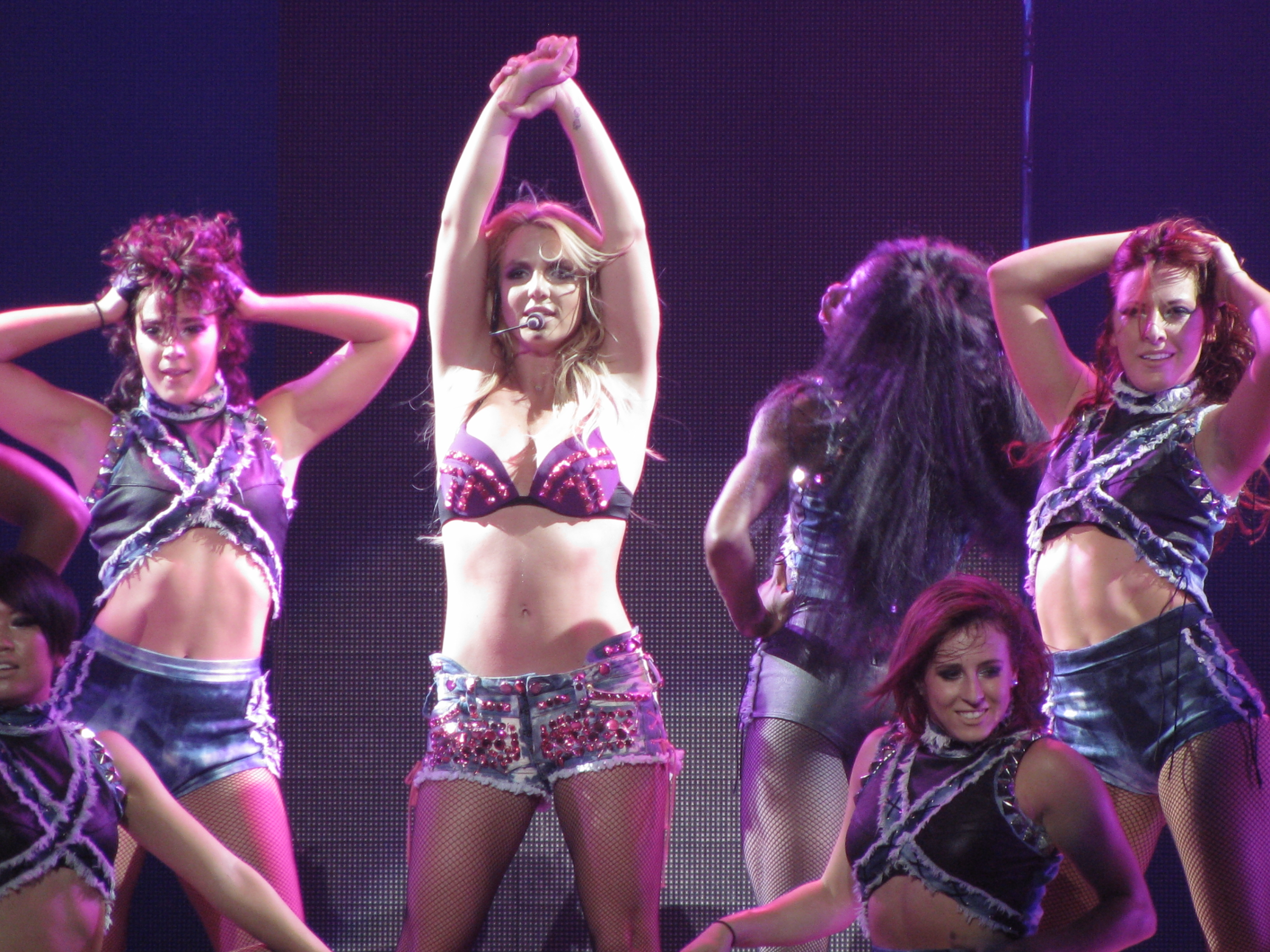
Spears performing "I'm a Slave 4 U" on the Femme Fatale Tour in 2011

Britney is a pop and R&B record with dance influences. It opens with the urban and Middle Eastern-influenced "I'm a Slave 4 U", which showcases breathy, emotive noises, and has been compared to "Nasty Girl" by Vanity 6. Spears commented that its lyrics are "about me just wanting to go out and forget who I am and dance and have a good time". Europop-styled "Overprotected" addresses a girl tired of being manipulated. Lyrically, "Lonely" sees a girl moving on from a troublesome romance after being lied to and manipulated, being considered "a teenage version" of Janet Jackson's "What About". The soft rock piano ballad "I'm Not a Girl, Not Yet a Woman", co-written by English singer-songwriter Dido, details the emotional struggles girls experience during puberty. "Boys" incorporates R&B and hip-hop styles, and was criticized by David Browne of Entertainment Weekly as "cut-rate '80s Janet Jackson". The disco-inspired track "Anticipating" discusses the friendship and camaraderie between women, and was described as reminiscent of Madonna's "Holiday" and "Kylie in disco mood."

Spears' cover of "I Love Rock 'n' Roll", made famous by Joan Jett and the Blackhearts, infuses pop rock styles into the original hard rock rendition. "Cinderella" reflects on a female protagonist who left her boyfriend after he failed to appreciate her efforts in the relationship. "Let Me Be" sees Spears ask to be trusted as an adult and be afforded her own opinions. "Bombastic Love" discusses a love in which the protagonist feels that the romance will happen "exactly like in a movie". Similarly, "That's Where You Take Me" details the joy she gets from an emotionally fulfilling relationship, amid Middle Eastern chimes and a collage of electronic beats and drum programming. On the electronica international editions bonus track "When I Found You", Spears sings about having found the "deepest love" in her soulmate who is essentially a reflection of herself. Britney closes with "What It's Like to Be Me", which was co-written and co-produced by Spears's then-boyfriend Justin Timberlake; Spears sings that a guy must "figure [her] out" to "be [her] man".

== Marketing and touring ==
On January 28, 2001, Spears performed at Super Bowl XXXV. Shortly after, she appeared on Total Request Live to premiere new material from Britney. On September 6, Spears premiered "I'm a Slave 4 U" at the 2001 MTV Video Music Awards; the performance was criticized for her use of a yellow python as a stage prop. Four days later, she performed "I'm a Slave 4 U" on The Rosie O'Donnell Show. Spears was scheduled to perform and hold a press conference in Australia on September 13; however, she cancelled the event in light of the September 11 attacks two days prior, saying that holding the conference would have been inappropriate. The following month, Spears performed at The Tonight Show with Jay Leno.

Britney was first released in Japan on October 31, being released in the United States on November 6, by Jive Records. An accompanying video album, titled Britney: The Videos, was released two weeks later. It included a selection of her earlier music videos, behind-the-scenes footage, commercials, and notable live performances. The video peaked atop the US Top Music Videos on December 8. Spears had already begun her Dream Within a Dream Tour in Columbus, Ohio five days before Britney was released in the US; the tour ended on July 28, 2002, in Mexico City. Shortly after it began, she performed in her first HBO concert special from the MGM Grand Garden Arena in Las Vegas; Cher was supposed to join Spears onstage for the song "The Beat Goes On", which Spears covered on ...Baby One More Time, but was unable to do so due to scheduling conflicts.

On December 4, 2001, Spears performed at the 2001 Billboard Music Awards in Las Vegas. On January 9, 2002, she performed "I'm Not a Girl, Not Yet a Woman" at the 2002 American Music Awards. Later that month, Spears gave interviews to The Frank Skinner Show in the United Kingdom and The Saturday Show in Australia. The feature film Crossroads, which starred Spears, premiered in February, allowing Spears to simultaneously promote both the film and her album. Several tracks from the album were featured in the film, and Britney was cross-promoted as the film's soundtrack. On February 2, Spears was featured as both the host and performer on Saturday Night Live. A week later, she performed "I'm Not a Girl, Not Yet a Woman" at the NBA All-Star Game and The Tonight Show with Jay Leno. Spears also appeared on Live with Regis and Kelly, The View, and the 44th Annual Grammy Awards, as well as the German talk show Wetten, dass..?.

After an extended play (EP) for "I'm a Slave 4 U" was made available for digital consumption on September 25, 2026, a reissue of Britney in commemoration its 25th anniversary was announced for a November 6 release.

=== Singles ===
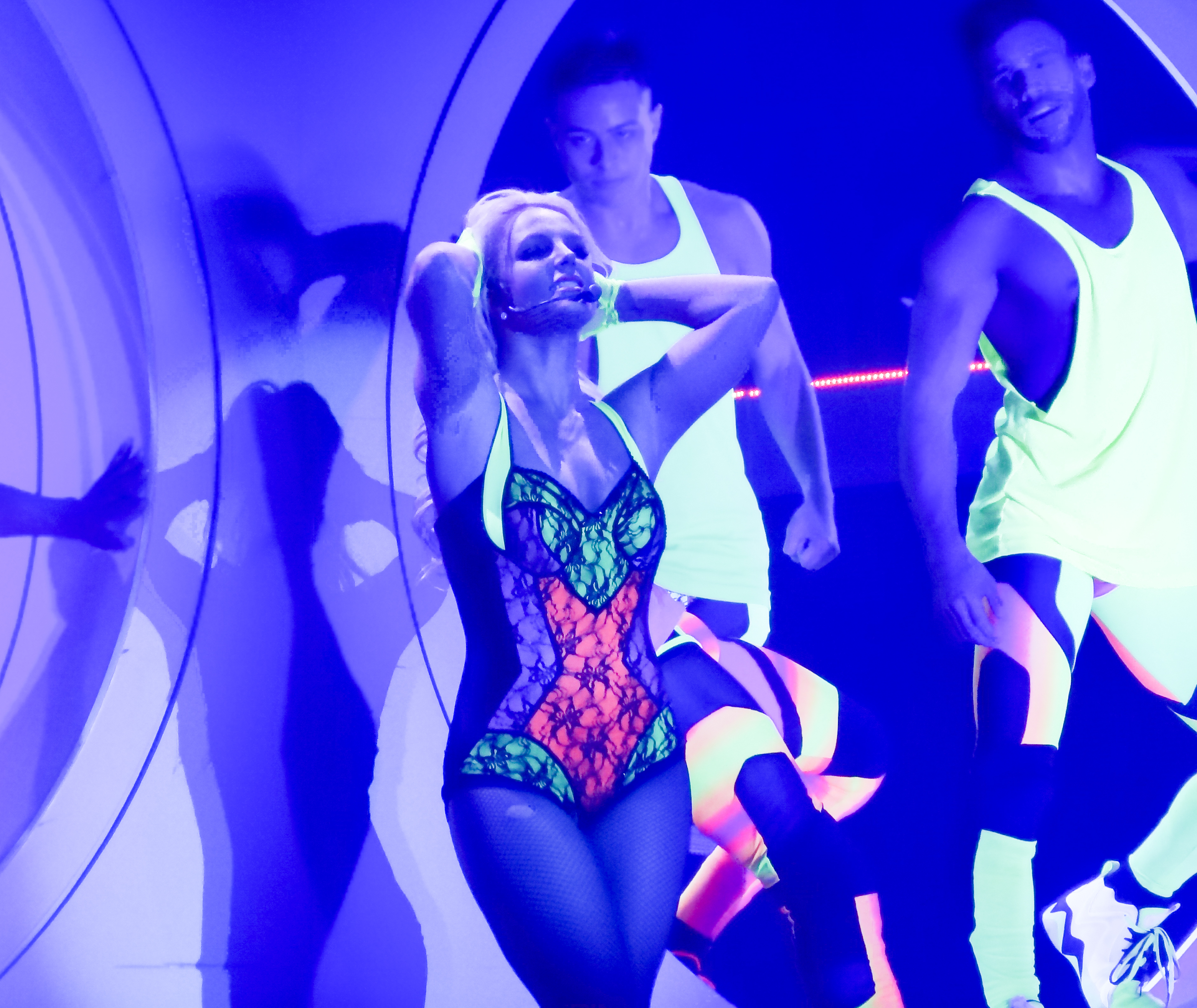
Spears performing "Boys" during Britney: Piece of Me in 2014

"I'm a Slave 4 U" was released as the album's lead single on September 25, 2001, to critical acclaim. It peaked at number 27 on the US Billboard Hot 100, becoming Spears' first lead single not to peak within the top ten. It fared better internationally, debuting at number four on the UK singles chart and peaking within the top ten in 20 countries. Its accompanying music video was directed by Francis Lawrence, and received three nominations at the 2002 MTV Video Music Awards.

"Overprotected" was released as the second international single from Britney on December 10, 2001, and the third North American single on April 2, 2002. Its Darkchild remix peaked at number 86 on the US Billboard Hot 100, while the original version reached the top ten in Belgium, Croatia, Finland, Greece, Hungary, Ireland, Italy, Norway, Poland, Romania, Sweden and the United Kingdom. Critically acclaimed, the song was nominated for the Best Female Pop Vocal Performance at the 45th Annual Grammy Awards (2003). Two accompanying music videos were released–the Bille Woodruff-directed video for the original version and the Chris Applebaum-directed Darkchild remix video.

Staggered to fit the varying release dates of Crossroads internationally, "I'm Not a Girl, Not Yet a Woman" was released as the film's theme song and the second North American single from Britney on January 7, 2002, to critical acclaim. It peaked at number two on the Bubbling Under Hot 100 Singles, the Billboard Hot 100 extension chart. The song fared better internationally, peaking at number two in the UK, and within the top ten in Australia, Austria, the Czech Republic, Germany, Ireland, the Netherlands and Sweden. Filmed in Arizona and at the Alstrom Point, the song's Wayne Isham-directed accompanying music video primarily consists of Spears, whilst wearing cowboy boots, performing the song whilst standing on the edge of a cliff, and inside a slot canyon.

"I Love Rock 'n' Roll" was released as the fourth international single from Britney on May 27, 2002, and the fifth and final UK single on November 4, to mixed critical reception. It reached the top ten in Austria, Croatia, Germany, Hungary, Ireland, Portugal, Scotland and Slovenia, whilst peaking at number 13 on the UK Singles Chart. Directed by Chris Applebaum, its accompanying music video shows Spears with her own band, a stack of speakers and flashing lights. In France, "Anticipating" was released as the fourth single instead of "I Love Rock 'n' Roll" on June 25; it reached number 38 on the French Singles Chart.

The Co-Ed Remix of "Boys"–featuring Pharrell Williams–was released as the fourth North American and UK single, and the fifth and final international single from Britney on June 24, 2002, also serving as the second single from the soundtrack for Austin Powers in Goldmember, to mixed critical reception. It peaked at number 22 on the US Bubbling Under Hot 100 Singles, and peaked at number seven on the UK Singles Chart. Its accompanying music video, directed by Dave Meyers, features Spears, Williams, and Mike Myers as Austin Powers at a party inside a castle, with cameo appearances from actors Jason Priestley, Justin Bruening and Taye Diggs. It was nominated for Best Video from a Film at the 2003 MTV Video Music Awards, but lost to Eminem's "Lose Yourself".

== Critical reception ==
Professional ratings
Aggregate scores
Source	Rating
Metacritic	58/100
Review scores
Source	Rating
AllMusic	4.5/5 stars
Blender	3/5 stars
Christgau's Consumer Guide	(2-star Honorable Mention)
Dotmusic	6/10
Entertainment Weekly	C
NME	3.5/5 stars
Q	3/5 stars
Rolling Stone	2.5/5 stars
Slant Magazine	2.5/5 stars
Spin	5/10

Britney received mixed reviews from music critics, who felt the album was underdeveloped thematically and sonically. At Metacritic, which assigns a normalized rating out of 100 to reviews from mainstream critics, Britney received an average score of 58, which indicates "mixed or average reviews", based on 13 reviews. David Browne of Entertainment Weekly found Spears's increasingly provocative image to be unnatural, noting "virginal vamping in an awkward adolescence" and "a few tentative new moves". PopMatters' Nikki Tranton complimented the production of the songs, but questioned if Spears was ready to establish herself as a grown woman in the music industry. Sal Cinquemani of Slant Magazine agreed, writing that although the record "fills her role of guilty pleasure (the disc certainly satiates more than the stunted growth of last year's Oops!...I Did It Again), it's time for Spears to quit being such a cock-tease and cook something up that will satisfy the ever-vacillating hype-machine".

AllMusic's Stephen Thomas Erlewine gave a positive review, feeling that the album "strives to deepen [Spears'] persona" and proves she "will know what to do when the teen-pop phenomenon of 1999–2001 passes for good". Similarly, a reviewer from Billboard commented that the project was "a nicely varied, wholly satisfying collection". Chris Heat of Dotmusic praised Britney for "us[ing] this opportunity to take the odd risk and adds a welcome edge to her sound". NME's Ted Kessler recognized the release as a "coming of age album" and joked that it "works best when making a good pop cheese and dance sandwich". By contrast, Stephen Thompson of The A.V. Club panned the album, opining that the music "just [isn't] catchy" and that "though neither a girl nor a woman, Spears inspires grown-up anger on her own". Craig Seymore of Spin recognized that she sounded "almost human", but criticized the musical style "as coldly anthemic as ever". Despite the critical polarity, Britney was nominated for Best Pop Vocal Album at the 45th Annual Grammy Awards (2003).

== Commercial performance ==
In the US, Britney debuted atop the Billboard 200 with first-week sales of 745,750 copies, which was the second highest first-week sales by a female artist at the time behind Spears' own Oops!... I Did It Again (2000). In doing so, Spears became the first woman to have her first three studio albums debut atop that chart. The album also registered the second-highest first-week sales of 2001, behind Celebrity by NSYNC, and also the highest first-week sales by a female artist of the year. Its performance on the Billboard charts contributed to Spears earning a nomination for Female Albums Artist of the Year at the 2001 Billboard Music Awards, less than a month after its release. After fluctuating within the top 20 of the chart in the following weeks, Britney went on to sell 3,300,000 copies by March 2002. As of March 2015, Britney has sold 4,400,000 units in the US, having been certified quadruple platinum by the Recording Industry Association of America (RIAA).

Internationally, Britney debuted atop the Canadian Albums Chart with first-week sales of 44,550 copies. It later sold 316,944 copies in the country, a significant decline in relation to the sales of ...Baby One More Time (1999) and Oops!... I Did It Again (2000). The album peaked at number four on both the Oricon Albums Chart in Japan and the UK Albums Chart. In the latter, it was certified platinum by the British Phonographic Industry (BPI) for shipments of 300,000 copies to retailers. Across the rest of Europe, Britney debuted at number one in Austria, Germany, and Switzerland. In 2002, it was certified double platinum by the International Federation of the Phonographic Industry (IFPI) for shipments of two million copies throughout Europe. The album also peaked at number four in Australia, and was certified double platinum by the Australian Recording Industry Association (ARIA). Britney was the fifth best-selling album of 2001 globally, selling seven million copies. By January 2003, the album had sold ten million copies worldwide.

== Track listing ==
Standard track listing
No.	Title	Writer(s)	Producer(s)	Length
1.	"I'm a Slave 4 U"	Chad Hugo; Pharrell Williams	The Neptunes	3:23
2.	"Overprotected"	Max Martin; Rami Yacoub	Martin; Yacoub	3:18
3.	"Lonely"	Britney Spears; Josh Schwartz; Brian Kierulf; Rodney "Darkchild" Jerkins	Darkchild	3:19
4.	"I'm Not a Girl, Not Yet a Woman"	Martin; Yacoub; Dido Armstrong	Martin; Yacoub	3:51
5.	"Boys"	Hugo; Williams	The Neptunes	3:26
6.	"Anticipating"	Spears; Schwartz; Kierulf	Kierulf; Schwartz	3:16
7.	"I Love Rock 'n' Roll"	Jake Hooker; Alan Merrill	Darkchild	3:06
8.	"Cinderella"	Spears; Martin; Yacoub	Martin; Yacoub	3:39
9.	"Let Me Be"	Spears; Schwartz; Kierulf	Darkchild	2:51
10.	"Bombastic Love"	Martin; Yacoub	Martin; Yacoub	3:05
11.	"That's Where You Take Me"	Spears; Schwartz; Kierulf	Kierulf; Schwartz	3:32
12.	"What It's Like to Be Me"	Justin Timberlake; Wade J. Robson	Robson; Timberlake	2:50
Total length:				39:47

25th anniversary edition track listing
No.	Title	Writer(s)	Producer(s)	Length
12.	"When I Found You"	Jörgen Elofsson; Dan Hill	Peter Kvint	3:36
13.	"I Run Away"	Schwartz; Kierulf	Kierulf; Schwartz	4:05
14.	"What It's Like to Be Me"	Timberlake; Robson	Robson; Timberlake	2:50
15.	"Before the Goodbye"	Spears; Brian Transeau; Schwartz; Kierulf	BT	3:50
16.	"Intimidated"	Spears; Jerkins; Schwartz; Kierulf	Darkchild	3:18
17.	"Overprotected" (The Darkchild remix)	Yacoub; Martin	Yacoub; Martin; Darkchild	3:20
18.	"Boys" (The Co-Ed remix)	Hugo; Williams	The Neptunes	3:45
19.	"Right Now (Taste the Victory)"	Kierulf; Steve Lunt; Schwartz	Kierulf; Lunt; Schwartz	2:44
20.	"She'll Never Be Me"	Spears; Bradley Daymond; Alex Greggs; Timberlake	Riprock 'n' Alex G	3:05
21.	"Am I a Sinner"	Spears; Daymond; Greggs	Riprock 'n' Alex G	3:48
22.	"When I Say So"	Spears; Brian Transeau; Schwartz; Kierulf	BT	2:55
23.	"My Big Secret"	Hugo; Williams	The Neptunes	4:31

=== Notes ===
- Enhanced CD pressings include an exclusive performance of "Overprotected" with outtake footage from Crossroads (2002).
- "When I Found You" originally appeared on international pressings and the deluxe edition.
- Track 15 originally appeared on Australian, Japanese, and UK pressings, as well as the deluxe edition.
- Track 13 originally appeared on Asian pressings, excluding Japan, and the deluxe edition.
- Special limited edition pressings include track 17, the Metro Remix of track 4, and the Thunderpuss Radio Mix of track 1. It also includes a bonus DVD containing interview segments titled "Britney Talks", music videos for tracks 1, 4, and 17, alongside behind-the-scenes footage of the Pepsi commercial "Right Now (Taste the Victory)".
- South Korean limited edition pressings include a bonus disc containing the album version, Spanish Fly Remix Radio Edit and Chocolate Puma Dub of track 4, alongside track 13, the music video for track 2, and the US movie trailer for the film Crossroads.

== Personnel ==
Credits are adapted from the liner notes of Britney.

- John Amatiello – engineering (tracks 2 and 4), engineering assistance (tracks 8 and 10)
- Dido Armstrong – songwriting (track 4)
- James Biondolillo – string arrangement (track 6)
- BossLady – backing vocals (tracks 2 and 10)
- Sue Ann Carwell – backing vocals (track 7)
- Andrew Coleman – engineering (tracks 1 and 5)
- Tyler Collins – backing vocals (track 7)
- Tom Coyne – mastering
- Jaime Duncan – engineering assistance (track 12)
- Brian Garten – engineering (track 1 and 5)
- Stephen George – mixing (track 6)
- Serban Ghenea – mixing (tracks 1 and 5)
- Brad Gilderman – engineering (track 7)
- Albert Hall – backing vocals (track 7)
- Damion Hall – backing vocals (track 7)
- Nana Hedin – backing vocals (track 10)
- Jean-Marie Horvat – mixing (tracks 3, 7 and 9)
- Rodney Jerkins – drum programming (tracks 3 and 9), production (tracks 3, 7 and 9), songwriting (track 3)
- Richard G. Johnson – engineering assistance (track 12)
- Jennifer Karr – backing vocals (tracks 3, 6, 9 and 11)
- Steven Klein – photography
- Marc Stephen Lee – engineering assistance (track 7)
- Thomas Lindberg – bass (track 4)
- Fabian Marasciullo – engineering (tracks 3 and 7), vocal engineering (track 9)
- Max Martin – backing vocals (track 4), engineering (tracks 2, 4, 8 and 10), guitar (track 2), mixing (tracks 2, 4, 8 and 10), production (tracks 2, 4, 8 and 10)
- Charles McCrorey – engineering assistance (tracks 2, 4, 6, 9 and 12)
- Daniel Milazzo – engineering assistance (track 5)
- Pablo Munguia – engineering (track 12)
- The Neptunes – instruments (track 1 and 5), production (tracks 1 and 5), songwriting (tracks 1 and 5)
- Esbjörn Öhrwall – guitar (track 4)
- Jeanette Olsson – backing vocals (tracks 4 and 8)
- Jeff Pescetto – backing vocals (track 7)
- Tim Roberts – engineering assistance (tracks 1 and 5)
- Wade Robson – production (track 12), songwriting (track 12)
- Nile Rodgers – guitar (track 6)
- Jason Scheff – backing vocals (track 7)
- Ryan Smith – engineering assistance (track 1)
- Britney Spears – conceptualization, songwriting (tracks 3, 6, 8, 9 and 11), vocals (all tracks)
- Mark Suozzo – string arrangement (track 6)
- Rich Tapper – engineering assistance (track 11)
- Jill Tengan – engineering assistance (tracks 3, 6 and 9)
- Chris Thompson – backing vocals (track 7)
- Justin Timberlake – backing vocals (track 12), production (track 12), songwriting (track 12), vocal arrangement (track 12)
- Michael Tucker – engineering (track 2), mixing (track 11)
- Rami Yacoub – engineering (tracks 2, 4, 8 and 10), mixing (tracks 2, 4, 8 and 10), production (tracks 2, 4, 8 and 10), songwriting (tracks 2, 4, 8 and 10)
- Yasu – engineering (track 6)

== Charts ==
=== Weekly charts ===
Weekly chart performance during 2001-2002
Chart (2001–2002)	Peak position
Argentine Albums (CAPIF)	5
Australian Albums (ARIA)	4
Austrian Albums (Ö3 Austria)	1
Belgian Albums (Ultratop Flanders)	2
Belgian Albums (Ultratop Wallonia)	3
Brazilian Albums (Istoé Rio de Janeiro)	6
Brazilian Albums (Istoé São Paulo)	3
Canadian Albums (Billboard)	1
Czech Albums (ČNS IFPI)	25
Danish Albums (Hitlisten)	8
Dutch Albums (Album Top 100)	11
European Top 100 Albums (Music & Media)	2
Finnish Albums (Suomen virallinen lista)	19
French Albums (SNEP)	2
German Albums (Offizielle Top 100)	1
Greek Albums (IFPI)	2
Hungarian Albums (MAHASZ)	5
Icelandic Albums (Tónlist)	6
Irish Albums (IRMA)	3
Israeli Albums (IFPI)	1
Italian Albums (FIMI)	10
Japanese Albums (Oricon)	4
Japanese Albums (Oricon) Special limited edition	13
Malaysian Albums (RIM)	2
New Zealand Albums (RMNZ)	17
Norwegian Albums (VG-lista)	5
Polish Albums (ZPAV)	3
Portuguese Albums (AFP)	7
Scottish Albums (Official Charts)	4
Singaporean Albums (RIAS)	8
South African Albums (RiSA)	7
Spanish Albums (PROMUSICAE)	3
Swedish Albums (Sverigetopplistan)	6
Swiss Albums (Schweizer Hitparade)	1
UK Albums (Official Charts)	4
UK Independent Albums (Official Charts)	1
US Billboard 200	1

Weekly chart performance during 2019
Chart (2019)	Peak position
US Vinyl Albums (Billboard)	24

Weekly chart performance during 2023
Chart (2023)	Peak position
Spanish Albums (PROMUSICAE)	78

=== Monthly charts ===
2002 monthly chart performance
Chart	Peak position
South Korean International Albums (RIAK)	1
South Korean International Albums (RIAK) Special limited edition	3
Uruguayan Albums (CUD)	4

=== Year-end charts ===
2001 year-end chart performance
Chart	Position
Australian Albums (ARIA)	76
Austrian Albums (Ö3 Austria)	75
Belgian Albums (Ultratop Flanders)	97
Belgian Albums (Ultratop Wallonia)	85
Canadian Albums (Nielsen SoundScan)	29
European Top 100 Albums (Music & Media)	90
French Albums (SNEP)	51
German Albums (Offizielle Top 100)	85
Global Albums (Billboard)	5
South Korean International Albums (MIAK)	8
Swedish Albums (Sverigetopplistan)	28
Swiss Albums (Schweizer Hitparade)	48
UK Albums (OCC)	105
US Billboard 200	118

2002 year-end chart performance
Chart	Position
Australian Albums (ARIA)	34
Austrian Albums (Ö3 Austria)	21
Belgian Albums (Ultratop Flanders)	36
Belgian Albums (Ultratop Wallonia)	46
Canadian Albums (Nielsen SoundScan)	47
Danish Albums (Hitlisten)	97
Dutch Albums (Album Top 100)	89
European Top 100 Albums (Music & Media)	22
French Albums (SNEP)	46
German Albums (Offizielle Top 100)	49
South Korean International Albums (MIAK)	7
South Korean International Albums (MIAK) Special limited edition	16
Swedish Albums (Sverigetopplistan)	80
Swiss Albums (Schweizer Hitparade)	49
UK Albums (OCC)	79
US Billboard 200	8

=== Decade-end charts ===
2000s decade-end chart performance
Chart	Position
US Billboard 200	64

== Certifications and sales ==
Certifications and sales
Region	Certification	Certified units/sales
Argentina (CAPIF)	Platinum	40,000^{^}
Australia (ARIA)	2× Platinum	140,000^{^}
Austria (IFPI Austria)	Platinum	40,000^{*}
Belgium (BRMA)	Platinum	50,000^{*}
Brazil (Pro-Música Brasil)	Gold	150,000
Canada (Music Canada)	3× Platinum	316,944
Denmark (IFPI Danmark)	Gold	25,000^{^}
Finland (Musiikkituottajat)	Gold	16,551
France (SNEP)	Platinum	300,000^{*}
Germany (BVMI)	Platinum	300,000^{^}
Hungary (MAHASZ)	Gold	25,000^{^}
Japan (RIAJ)	Platinum	200,000^{^}
Mexico (AMPROFON)	Platinum	250,000
Netherlands (NVPI)	Gold	40,000^{^}
New Zealand (RMNZ)	Gold	7,500^{^}
Philippines (PARI)	Platinum	
South Africa (RISA)	Platinum	50,000^{*}
South Korea	—	274,993 (Note: In South Korea, Britney sold 119,139 copies within the last two months of 2001, and additional 83,765 copies throughout 2002, according to the Korea Music Content Industry Association. The album's limited edition sold 62,101 copies in 2002, and 9,988 copies within the first half of 2003, bringing the sales total to 274,993 copies.)
Spain (Promusicae)	Platinum	250,000
Sweden (GLF)	Gold	40,000^{^}
Switzerland (IFPI Switzerland)	2× Platinum	80,000^{^}
United Kingdom (BPI)	Platinum	477,000
United States (RIAA)	4× Platinum	4,988,000 (Note: According to Nielsen SoundScan, Britney has sold 4,400,000 copies in the US as of July 2016. Nielsen SoundScan did not count sales via music clubs such as BMG Music Service, through which the album had sold 588,000 additional units by 2003, bringing its sales total to 4,988,000 units.)
Summaries
Europe (IFPI)	2× Platinum	2,000,000^{*}
Worldwide	—	10,000,000
^{*} Sales figures based on certification alone.^{^} Shipments figures based on certification alone.

== Release history ==
Release dates and formats
Region	Date	Edition(s)	Format(s)	Label(s)	Ref.
Japan	October 31, 2001	Standard	CD	Zomba	
Argentina	November 2, 2001	Standard	Enhanced CD	EMI	
France	November 4, 2001	Standard	Enhanced CD	Virgin	
Australia	November 5, 2001	Standard	Enhanced CD	Zomba	
Germany	November 5, 2001	Standard	Enhanced CD	Rough Trade	
United Kingdom	November 5, 2001	Standard	Enhanced CD	Jive	
South Korea	November 6, 2001	Standard	Cassette; enhanced CD	Rock	
United States	November 6, 2001	Standard	Cassette; enhanced CD	Jive	
Germany	June 3, 2002	Special limited	CD+DVD	Rough Trade	
South Korea	June 4, 2002	Special limited	CD+DVD	Rock	
Japan	June 5, 2002	Special limited	CD+DVD	Zomba	
Australia	June 10, 2002	Special limited	CD+DVD	Zomba	
Germany	June 30, 2003	Deluxe	CD	Rough Trade	
France	October 14, 2003	Deluxe	CD	Jive	
United States	December 25, 2007	Deluxe	Digital download	Jive	
Various	March 31, 2023	Standard	Vinyl (Note: Prior to the 2023 vinyl release, Britney was made available on limited-edition vinyl exclusively at Urban Outfitters in May 2019.)	Legacy	
Various	November 6, 2026	25th anniversary	Digital download; streaming	RCA	

== See also ==
- Britney Spears discography
- List of best-selling albums by women
- List of best-selling albums of the 21st century
- List of Billboard 200 number-one albums of 2001
- List of number-one albums of 2001 (Canada)
- List of number-one hits of 2001 (Germany)
