= Britney Spears discography =

Discography of American singer

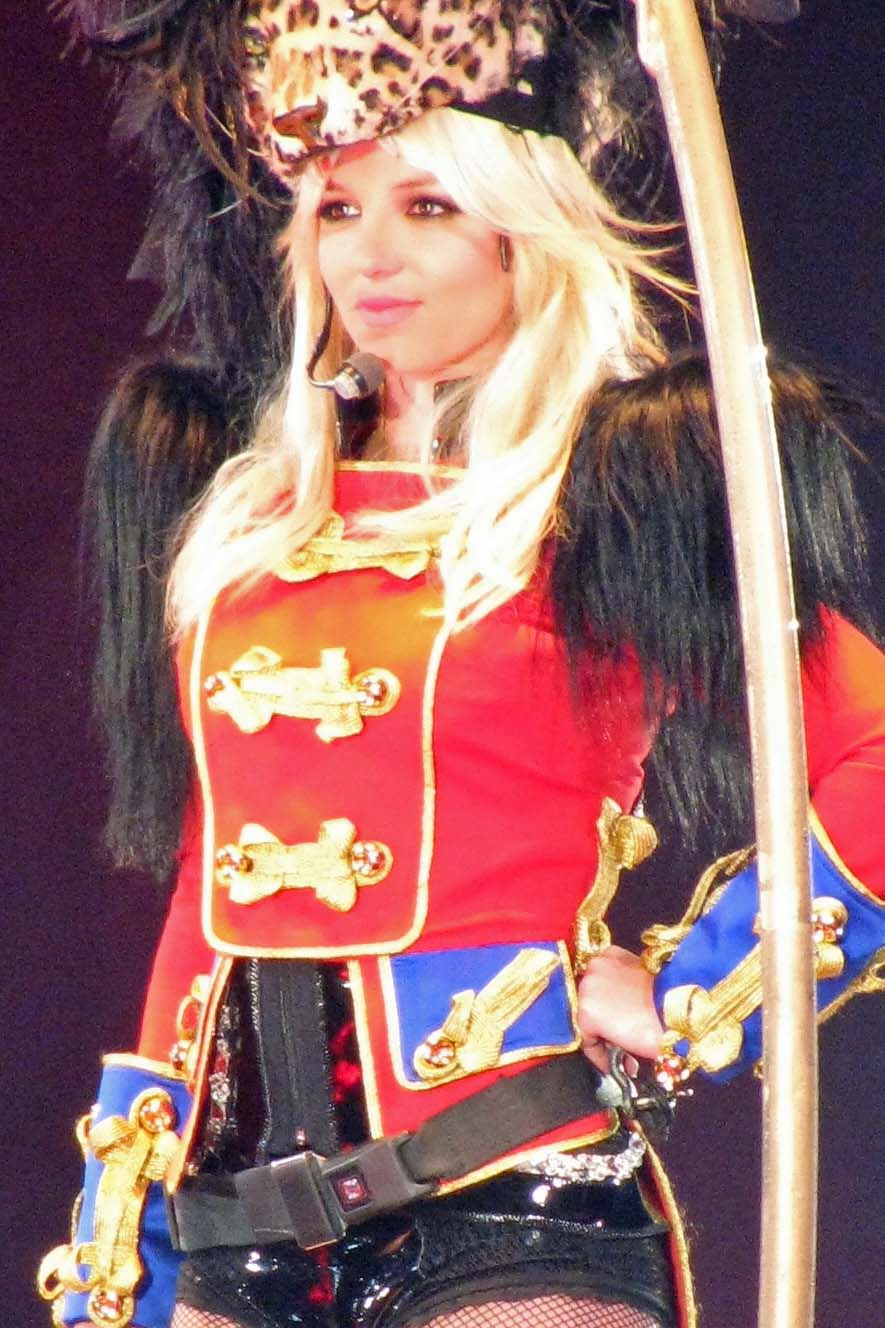
- Spears performing in March 2009
- Studio albums: 9
- Extended plays: 3
- Compilation albums: 8
- Singles: 50
- Promotional singles: 10
- Remix albums: 3
- Box sets: 9

American singer Britney Spears has released nine studio albums, eight compilation albums, nine box sets, three extended plays (EPs), 50 singles (including two as a featured artist), 10 promotional singles, two charity singles, and has made three guest appearances. In 1997, Spears signed a recording contract with American record label Jive Records in order to launch her career.

Spears made her chart debut in November 1998 with "...Baby One More Time", which was followed by the release of her debut studio album, ...Baby One More Time (1999). The record opened the Canadian Albums Chart and the US Billboard 200 at number one, being later certified fourteen times platinum by the Recording Industry Association of America (RIAA). The singer's second studio album, Oops!... I Did It Again, was made available for consumption on May 16, 2000, and became the fastest-selling record ever by a female act in America, bringing first-week sales of 1,319,193 units and certified diamond in United States. It spawned four singles—"Oops!... I Did It Again", "Lucky", "Stronger", and "Don't Let Me Be the Last to Know". In November 2001, the singer's third album spawned worldwide hit "I'm a Slave 4 U", which had been pointed out by music critics for being a musical departure from her previous material. Spears released her fourth studio album, In the Zone, in November 2003, which featured "Me Against the Music"—a collaboration with Madonna that reached the top position of the European Hot 100 Singles—and "Toxic", which earned Spears her first Grammy in the category of Best Dance Recording, and gained her credibility among critics. The singer's first compilation album, Greatest Hits: My Prerogative, was released the following year.

Following experiencing personal struggles through 2007, Spears's fifth studio album, Blackout, was released in October of the same year. Unlike all of the singer's previous records, Blackout failed to be heavily promoted through magazine interviews, talk-show appearances, or televised performances—besides a performance at the 2007 MTV Video Music Awards—and was not accompanied by a supporting tour either. With the release of her sixth studio album Circus, Spears became the only act in the Nielsen SoundScan era—from 1991 to present,—to have four records debuting with 500,000 or more copies sold in the United States. Supported by the releases of commercially successful international hits like "Womanizer" and "Circus", it managed to sale four million copies globally. The singer's third compilation album, The Singles Collection, featured her third number-one single in America, "3". In 2011, she released the song "Hold It Against Me", which made Spears the second artist in the Billboard Hot 100's 52-year history to debut at number one with two or more songs, just behind American recording artist Mariah Carey. The track was included on her seventh studio album, Femme Fatale, which debuted at number one in that country. Also her first album ever to yield three top ten hits in the US, including commercially successful singles like "Till the World Ends" and "I Wanna Go". Spears's eighth studio album, Britney Jean, was released in 2013. It marks Spears's first major activity under RCA Records since the dissolution of her long-time record label, Jive Records, in 2011. Receiving mixed reviews from music critics, it experienced minor commercial success, and thus became the lowest-selling record of her career. Spears began working on her ninth studio album in 2014; she also renewed her record deal with RCA Records. Glory was released in 2016 and received positive reviews from music critics. The album debuted at number three on US Billboard 200 with 111,000 album-equivalent units, including 88,000 copies sold, and spawned the singles "Make Me" and "Slumber Party", which peaked at 17 and 86 on the Hot 100, and topped the Dance Club Songs in the United States.

Spears has sold over 150 million records worldwide, including 70 million records in United States (36.9 million digital singles and 33.6 million digital albums), making her one of the best-selling music artists of all time. Billboard ranked her the eighth overall Artist of the Decade, and also recognized her as the best-selling female album artist of the 21st century's first decade, as well as the fifth overall. Additionally, the Recording Industry Association of America recognized Spears as the ninth best-selling female artist in the United States, with 38.5 million certified albums. Spears serves as one of the few artists in history to have a number-one single and studio album in each of the three decades of their career—1990s, 2000s, and 2010s. As of 2020, Spears has reportedly drawn 25.9 billion in cumulative radio airplay audience and 3.7 billion on-demand U.S. audio and video streams combined.

== Albums ==
=== Studio albums ===
List of studio albums, with selected chart positions, sales figures, and certifications
Title	Studio album details	Peak chart positions										Sales	Certifications
Title	Studio album details	US	AUS	CAN	FRA	GER	IRE	NZ	SWE	SWI	UK	Sales	Certifications
...Baby One More Time	Released: January 12, 1999; Label: Jive; Formats: Cassette, CD, digital download, LP, streaming	1	2	1	4	1	6	3	10	1	2	US: 12,300,000 (Note: United States combined sales figures for ...Baby One More Time as of May 2020. The album has sold 10,700,000 in the US according to Nielsen SoundScan, with an additional 1,600,000 sold at BMG Music Clubs. Nielsen SoundScan does not count albums sold through clubs like the BMG Music Service, which were significantly popular in the 1990s.); CAN: 922,820 (Note: Canada sales figures for ...Baby One More Time as March 2003.); FRA: 625,000 (Note: France sales figures for ...Baby One More Time as of September 2018.); UK: 1,210,000 (Note: United Kingdom sales figures for ...Baby One More Time as of December 2018.)	RIAA: 14× Platinum (Diamond); ARIA: 4× Platinum; BPI: 4× Platinum; BVMI: 3× Gold; IFPI: 4× Platinum; IFPI SWE: Platinum; IFPI SWI: Platinum; MC: Diamond; RMNZ: 3× Platinum; SNEP: 2× Platinum
Oops!... I Did It Again	Released: May 16, 2000; Label: Jive; Formats: Cassette, CD, digital download, LP, streaming	1	2	1	1	1	3	2	1	1	2	US: 10,410,000 (Note: United States combined sales figures for Oops!...I Did It Again as of May 2020. The album has sold 9,200,000 in the US according to Nielsen SoundScan, with an additional 1,210,000 sold at BMG Music Clubs. Nielsen SoundScan does not count albums sold through clubs like the BMG Music Service, which were significantly popular in the 1990s.); CAN: 710,044 (Note: Canada sales figures for Oops!...I Did It Again as March 2003.); FRA: 406,106 (Note: France sales figures for Oops!...I Did It Again as of December 2009.); SWE: 130,000 (Note: Sweden sales figures for Oops!...I Did It Again as of December 2000.); UK: 917,000 (Note: United Kingdom sales figures for Oops!...I Did It Again as 2020.)	RIAA: Diamond; ARIA: 3× Platinum; BPI: 3× Platinum; BVMI: 3× Platinum; IFPI: 4× Platinum; IFPI SWE: Platinum; IFPI SWI: 2× Platinum; MC: 5× Platinum; RMNZ: 2× Platinum; SNEP: Platinum
Britney	Released: November 6, 2001; Label: Jive; Formats: Cassette, CD, DataPlay disc, digital download, LP, streaming	1	4	1	2	1	3	17	6	1	4	US: 4,988,000 (Note: United States combined sales figures for Britney as of May 2020. The album has sold 4,400,000 in the US according to Nielsen SoundScan, with an additional 588,000 sold at BMG Music Clubs. Nielsen SoundScan does not count albums sold through clubs like the BMG Music Service, which were significantly popular in the 1990s.); CAN: 316,944 (Note: Canada sales figures for Britney as March 2003.); FRA: 365,058 (Note: France sales figures for Britney as of December 2009.); UK: 477,000 (Note: United Kingdom sales figures for Britney as 2020.)	RIAA: 4× Platinum; ARIA: 2× Platinum; BPI: Platinum; BVMI: Platinum; IFPI: 2× Platinum; IFPI SWE: Gold; IFPI SWI: Platinum; MC: 3× Platinum; RMNZ: Gold; SNEP: Platinum
In the Zone	Released: November 18, 2003; Label: Jive; Formats: Cassette, CD, digital download, LP, streaming	1	10	2	1	2	3	25	8	6	13	US: 3,000,000 (Note: United States sales figures for In the Zone as of May 2020.); FRA: 258,918 (Note: France sales figures for In the Zone as of December 2009.); UK: 540,000 (Note: United Kingdom sales figures for In the Zone as of November 2018.)	RIAA: 3× Platinum; ARIA: Platinum; BPI: Platinum; BVMI: Platinum; IFPI: Platinum; IFPI SWE: Gold; IFPI SWI: Gold; MC: 3× Platinum; RMNZ: Gold; SNEP: 2× Gold
Blackout	Released: October 30, 2007; Label: Jive; Formats: Cassette, CD, digital download, LP, streaming	2	3	1	2	10	1	8	11	4	2	US: 1,000,000 (Note: United States sales figures for Blackout as of May 2020.); UK: 291,075 (Note: United Kingdom sales figures for Blackout as of October 2017.)	RIAA: 2× Platinum; ARIA: Platinum; BPI: Platinum; BVMI: Gold; IRMA: Platinum; MC: 2× Platinum; RMNZ: Gold; SNEP: Gold
Circus	Released: December 2, 2008; Label: Jive; Formats: Cassette, CD, digital download, LP, streaming	1	3	1	3	9	2	6	19	1	4	US: 1,700,000 (Note: United States sales figures for Circus as of May 2020.); CAN: 143,000 (Note: Canada sales figures for Circus as of January 2009.); FRA: 200,000 (Note: France sales figures for Circus as December 2018.)	RIAA: 3× Platinum; ARIA: 2× Platinum; BPI: Platinum; BVMI: Gold; IFPI SWI: Gold; IRMA: Platinum; MC: 4× Platinum; RMNZ: Platinum; SNEP: Gold
Femme Fatale	Released: March 29, 2011; Label: Jive; Formats: Cassette, CD, digital download, LP, streaming	1	1	1	4	10	4	3	5	2	8	US: 805,000 (Note: United States sales figures for Femme Fatale as of May 2020.); FRA: 81,700 (Note: France sales figures for Femme Fatale as of December 2011.); UK: 60,000 (Note: United Kingdom sales figures for Femme Fatale as of December 2013.)	RIAA: Platinum; ARIA: Gold; BPI: Gold; IFPI SWE: Gold; IRMA: Gold; MC: 2× Platinum; RMNZ: Gold; SNEP: Gold
Britney Jean	Released: December 3, 2013; Label: RCA; Formats: CD, digital download, LP, streaming	4	12	7	21	20	15	22	28	9	34	US: 280,000 (Note: United States sales figures for Britney Jean as of May 2020.); FRA: 25,000 (Note: France sales figures for Britney Jean as of May 2014.)	RIAA: Gold; MC: Gold
Glory	Released: August 26, 2016; Label: RCA; Formats: CD, digital download, LP, streaming	3	4	4	6	3	1	8	12	4	2	US: 157,000 (Note: United States sales figures for Glory as of May 2020.); FRA: 10,500 (Note: France sales figures for Glory as of December 2016.)	MC: Gold

=== Compilation albums ===
List of compilation albums, with selected chart positions, sales figures, and certifications
Title	Album details	Peak chart positions										Sales	Certifications
Title	Album details	US	AUS	CAN	FRA	GER	IRE	NZ	SWE	SWI	UK	Sales	Certifications
Greatest Hits: My Prerogative	Released: November 9, 2004; Label: Jive; Formats: CD, digital download, LP, streaming	4	4	3	85	4	1	17	14	6	2	US: 1,800,000 (Note: United States sales figures for Greatest Hits: My Prerogative as of January 2019.); FRA: 219,200 (Note: France sales figures for Greatest Hits: My Prerogative as of December 2005.); UK: 1,000,000 (Note: United Kingdom sales figures for Greatest Hits: My Prerogative as of August 2016.)	RIAA: Platinum; ARIA: 2× Platinum; BPI: 3× Platinum; BVMI: Gold; IFPI SWI: Gold; MC: Platinum; RMNZ: Gold; SNEP: 2× Gold
B in the Mix: The Remixes	Released: November 22, 2005; Label: Jive; Formats: CD, digital download, streaming	134	—	—	—	—	—	—	—	—	—	US: 138,000 (Note: United States sales figures for B in the Mix: The Remixes as of January 2019.)	
The Singles Collection	Released: November 10, 2009; Label: Jive; Formats: CD, digital download, streaming	22	23	19	—	80	24	22	—	51	38	US: 268,000 (Note: United States sales figures for The Singles Collection as of May 2020.)	ARIA: Gold; BPI: 2× Platinum; MC: 6× Platinum; RMNZ: Gold
B in the Mix: The Remixes Vol. 2	Released: October 11, 2011; Label: RCA; Formats: CD, digital download, streaming	47	—	53	57	—	—	—	—	—	171	US: 30,000 (Note: United States sales figures for B in the Mix: The Remixes Vol. 2 as of January 2019.)	
Oops! I Did It Again: The Best of Britney Spears	Released: June 15, 2012; Label: Sony; Formats: CD, digital download, streaming	—	—	—	—	—	—	—	—	—	—		
Playlist: The Very Best of Britney Spears	Released: November 6, 2012; Label: Legacy; Formats: CD	111	—	—	—	—	—	—	—	—	—	US: 170,000 (Note: United States sales figures for Playlist: The Very Best of Britney Spears as of May 2020.)	
The Essential Britney Spears	Released: August 20, 2013; Label: Legacy, RCA; Formats: CD, digital download, streaming	185	—	37	—	—	80	—	—	—	128	US: 60,000 (Note: United States sales figures for The Essential Britney Spears as of May 2020.)	BPI: Silver; RMNZ: 2× Platinum
Oops!...I Did It Again (Remixes and B-Sides)	Released: September 26, 2020; Label: Legacy; Format: LP	165	—	—	—	—	—	—	—	—	—		
"—" denotes items which did not chart in that country.

=== Box sets ===
List of box sets
Title	Album details
The Singles	Released: September 5, 2000; Label: Sony; Format: CD
...Baby One More Time / Oops!... I Did It Again	Released: November 26, 2002; Label: Jive; Format: CD
In the Zone / Britney	Released: October 1, 2007; Label: Sony BMG; Format: CD
Greatest Hits: My Prerogative / Live and More!	Released: December 8, 2008; Label: Jive; Format: CD/DVD
Circus / Blackout	Released: October 19, 2010; Label: Sony; Format: CD
Femme Fatale / Circus	Released: August 27, 2012; Label: Sony; Formats: CD, streaming
Triple Feature	Released: October 9, 2012; Label: Sony; Format: CD
In the Zone / Circus	Released: March 18, 2013; Label: Sony; Formats: CD, streaming
Femme Fatale / Britney Jean	Released: August 14, 2015; Label: RCA/Legacy; Format: CD

== Extended plays ==
List of extended plays
Title	Details
Britney Spears: In the Zone	Released: April 6, 2004; Label: Jive; Formats: CD, digital download, streaming
Britney & Kevin: Chaotic	Released: September 27, 2005; Label: Jive; Formats: CD, digital download, streaming
Key Cuts from Remixed	Released: September 2005; Label: Jive; Formats: 12", CD

== Singles ==
=== 1990s ===
List of singles in the 1990s decade, showing selected chart positions, sales figures, and certifications
Title	Year	Peak chart positions										Sales	Certifications	Album
Title	Year	US	AUS	CAN	FRA	GER	IRE	NZ	SWE	SWI	UK	Sales	Certifications	Album
"...Baby One More Time"	1998	1	1	1	1	1	1	1	1	1	1	US: 1,923,000 (Note: United States sales figures for "...Baby One More Time" as of June 2012.); UK: 2,000,000 (Note: United Kingdom sales figures for "...Baby One More Time" as of August 2022.)	RIAA: 5× Platinum; ARIA: 3× Platinum; BPI: 4× Platinum; BVMI: 3× Gold; IFPI SWE: Platinum; IFPI SWI: Platinum; RMNZ: 3× Platinum; SNEP: Platinum	...Baby One More Time
"Sometimes"	1999	21	2	7	9	6	5	1	4	7	3	UK: 584,000 (Note: United Kingdom sales figures for "Sometimes" as of August 2022.)	RIAA: Gold; ARIA: Platinum; BPI: Platinum; IFPI SWE: Gold; RMNZ: Gold; SNEP: Gold	...Baby One More Time
"(You Drive Me) Crazy"	1999	10	12	3	2	4	3	2	4	5	5	FRA: 117,200 (Note: France sales figures for "(You Drive Me) Crazy" as of December 2014.); UK: 489,000 (Note: United Kingdom sales figures for "(You Drive Me) Crazy" as of September 2024.)	RIAA: Platinum; ARIA: Platinum; BPI: Gold; BVMI: Gold; IFPI SWE: Platinum; RMNZ: Gold; SNEP: Gold	...Baby One More Time
"Born to Make You Happy"	1999	—	—	—	9	3	1	—	2	3	1	FRA: 117,700 (Note: France sales figures for "Born to Make You Happy" as of December 2014.); UK: 335,000 (Note: United Kingdom sales figures for "Born to Make You Happy" as of December 2013.)	BPI: Gold; BVMI: Gold; IFPI SWE: Platinum; SNEP: Gold	...Baby One More Time
"From the Bottom of My Broken Heart"	1999	14	37	25	—	—	—	23	—	—	178	US: 811,000 (Note: United States sales figures for "From the Bottom of My Broken Heart" as of June 2012.)	RIAA: Platinum	...Baby One More Time
"—" denotes items which did not chart or was not released in that territory.

=== 2000s ===
List of singles in the 2000s decade, showing selected chart positions, sales figures, and certifications
Title	Year	Peak chart positions										Sales	Certifications	Album
Title	Year	US	AUS	CAN	FRA	GER	IRE	NZ	SWE	SWI	UK	Sales	Certifications	Album
"Oops!... I Did It Again"	2000	9	1	1	4	2	2	1	1	1	1	US: 426,000 (Note: United States sales figures for "Oops!... I Did It Again" as of January 2011.); FRA: 173,600 (Note: France sales figures for "Oops!... I Did It Again" as of December 2014.); UK: 931,000 (Note: United Kingdom sales figures for "Oops!... I Did It Again" as of August 2022.)	RIAA: 4× Platinum; ARIA: Platinum; BPI: 2× Platinum; BVMI: Gold; IFPI SWE: 2× Platinum; IFPI SWI: Gold; MC: Platinum; RMNZ: 2× Platinum; SNEP: Gold	Oops!... I Did It Again
"Lucky"	2000	23	3	2	16	1	2	4	1	1	5	FRA: 64,209 (Note: France sales figures for "Lucky" as of December 2009.); UK: 225,000 (Note: United Kingdom sales figures for "Lucky" as of October 2010.)	RIAA: Platinum; ARIA: Platinum; BPI: Gold; BVMI: Gold; IFPI SWE: Platinum; MC: Gold; RMNZ: Platinum (Note: "Lucky" was also certified Gold for digital sales in 2024.)	Oops!... I Did It Again
"Stronger"	2000	11	13	9	20	4	6	15	4	6	7	US: 685,000 (Note: United States sales figures for "Stronger" as of June 2012.); FRA: 92,600 (Note: France sales figures for "Stronger" as of December 2014.); UK: 185,000 (Note: United Kingdom sales figures for "Stronger" as of October 2010.)	RIAA: Platinum; ARIA: Gold; BPI: Gold; IFPI SWE: Gold; MC: Gold; BVMI: Gold; RMNZ: Gold; SNEP: Gold	Oops!... I Did It Again
"Don't Let Me Be the Last to Know"	2001	—	—	—	27	12	12	—	12	9	12	FRA: 29,714 (Note: France sales figures for "Don't Let Me Be the Last to Know" as of December 2009.)		Oops!... I Did It Again
"I'm a Slave 4 U"	2001	27	7	8	8	3	6	13	7	7	4	US: 423,000 (Note: United States sales figures for "I'm a Slave 4 U" as of January 2011.); FRA: 198,500 (Note: France sales figures for "I'm a Slave 4 U" as of December 2014.); UK: 231,000 (Note: United Kingdom sales figures for "I'm a Slave 4 U" as of August 2017.)	RIAA: 2× Platinum; ARIA: Gold; BPI: Gold; IFPI SWE: Gold; RMNZ: Gold; SNEP: Silver	Britney
"Overprotected"	2001	86	16	22	15	—	9	—	2	—	4	FRA: 87,930 (Note: France sales figures for "Overprotected" as of December 2009.)	RIAA: Gold; ARIA: Gold; BPI: Silver; IFPI SWE: Gold; SNEP: Gold	Britney
"I'm Not a Girl, Not Yet a Woman"	2002	— (Note: "I'm Not a Girl, Not Yet a Woman" did not enter the Billboard Hot 100, but peaked at number two on the Bubbling Under Hot 100 chart.)	7	—	25	10	3	40	4	16	2	FRA: 34,256 (Note: France sales figures for "I'm Not a Girl, Not Yet a Woman" as of December 2009.); UK: 150,000 (Note: United Kingdom sales figures for "I'm Not a Girl, Not Yet a Woman" as of October 2010.)	RIAA: Gold; ARIA: Gold; BPI: Silver	Britney
"I Love Rock 'n' Roll"	2002	—	13	—	—	7	8	—	—	15	13		ARIA: Gold	Britney
"Boys" (featuring Pharrell Williams)	2002	— (Note: "Boys" did not enter the Billboard Hot 100, but peaked at number 22 on the Bubbling Under Hot 100 chart.)	14	21	55	19	10	39	11	20	7	FRA: 20,898 (Note: France sales figures for "Boys" as of December 2009.)	ARIA: Gold	Britney and Austin Powers in Goldmember
"Anticipating"	2002	—	—	—	38	—	—	—	—	—	—	FRA: 23,721 (Note: France sales figures for "Anticipating" as of December 2009.)		Britney
"Me Against the Music" (featuring Madonna)	2003	35	1	2	11	5	1	13	5	4	2	US: 341,000 (Note: United States sales figures for "Me Against the Music" as of June 2012.); FRA: 72,479 (Note: France sales figures for "Me Against the Music" as of December 2009.); UK: 240,000 (Note: United Kingdom sales figures for "Me Against the Music" as of October 2010.)	RIAA: Gold; ARIA: Platinum; BPI: Silver	In the Zone
"Toxic"	2004	9	1	1	3	4	1	2	2	4	1	US: 2,300,000 (Note: United States sales figures for "Toxic" as July 2016.); FRA: 160,300 (Note: France sales figures for "Toxic" as of December 2014.); UK: 1,300,000 (Note: United Kingdom sales figures for "Toxic" as of August 2022.)	RIAA: 6× Platinum; ARIA: Platinum; BPI: 3× Platinum; BVMI: 3× Gold; IFPI SWE: Gold; RMNZ: 5× Platinum; SNEP: Gold	In the Zone
"Everytime"	2004	15	1	2	2	4	1	—	3	6	1	FRA: 112,400 (Note: France sales figures for "Everytime" as of December 2014.); UK: 562,000 (Note: United Kingdom sales figures for "Everytime" as of August 2022.)	RIAA: Platinum; ARIA: Gold; BVMI: Gold; BPI: Platinum; IFPI SWE: Gold; SNEP: Gold	In the Zone
"Outrageous"	2004	79	—	—	—	—	—	—	—	—	—			In the Zone
"My Prerogative"	2004	— (Note: "My Prerogative" did not enter the Billboard Hot 100, but peaked at number one on the Bubbling Under Hot 100 chart.)	7	—	18	3	1	17	6	4	3	US: 374,000 (Note: United States sales figures for "My Prerogative" as of January 2011.); FRA: 60,237 (Note: France sales figures for "My Prerogative" as of December 2009.); UK: 130,000 (Note: United Kingdom sales figures for "My Prerogative" as of October 2015.)	RIAA: Gold; ARIA: Gold; BPI: Silver	Greatest Hits: My Prerogative
"Do Somethin'"	2005	100	8	16	70	18	4	—	10	11	6	US: 363,000 (Note: United States sales figures for "Do Somethin'" as of August 2010.)	RIAA: Gold; ARIA: Gold	Greatest Hits: My Prerogative
"Someday (I Will Understand)"	2005	—	—	—	—	22	—	—	10	8	—	US: 60,000 (Note: United States sales figures for "Someday (I Will Understand)" as of August 2010.)		Britney & Kevin: Chaotic
"Gimme More"	2007	3	3	1	5	7	2	15	2	4	3	US: 1,840,000 (Note: United States sales figures for "Gimme More" as of July 2016.); FRA: 48,870 (Note: France sales figures for "Gimme More" as of December 2009.); UK: 596,000 (Note: United Kingdom sales figures for "Gimme More" as of August 2022.)	RIAA: 4× Platinum; ARIA: Gold; BPI: 2× Platinum; BVMI: Gold; MC: 2× Platinum; RMNZ: 2× Platinum	Blackout
"Piece of Me"	2007	18	2	5	—	7	1	4	9	19	2	US: 1,900,000 (Note: United States sales figures for "Piece of Me" as of July 2016.); UK: 427,000 (Note: United Kingdom sales figures for "Piece of Me" as of August 2022.)	RIAA: 2× Platinum; ARIA: Platinum; BPI: Gold; BVMI: Gold; IFPI SWE: Gold; MC: Platinum; RMNZ: Platinum	Blackout
"Break the Ice"	2008	43	23	9	—	25	7	24	11	63	15	US: 688,000 (Note: United States sales figures for "Break the Ice'" as of July 2010.)	RIAA: Platinum; BPI: Silver	Blackout
"Womanizer"	2008	1	5	1	1	4	2	9	1	2	3	US: 3,500,000 (Note: United States sales figures for "Womanizer" as of July 2016.); FRA: 209,700 (Note: France sales figures for "Womanizer" as of December 2014.); UK: 835,000 (Note: United Kingdom sales figures for "Womanizer" as of August 2022.)	RIAA: 6× Platinum; ARIA: Platinum; BPI: 2× Platinum; BVMI: Gold; IFPI SWE: Gold; RMNZ: 2× Platinum	Circus
"Circus"	2008	3	6	2	—	11	12	4	6	19	13	US: 3,200,000 (Note: United States sales figures for "Circus" as of July 2016.); FRA: 29,272 (Note: France sales figures for "Circus" as of December 2009.); UK: 462,000 (Note: United Kingdom sales figures for "Circus" as of August 2022.)	RIAA: 5× Platinum; ARIA: Platinum; BPI: Platinum; BVMI: Gold; RMNZ: Platinum	Circus
"If U Seek Amy"	2009	19	11	13	—	36	11	17	13	61	20	US: 1,300,000 (Note: United States sales figures for "If U Seek Amy" as of July 2016.); FRA: 39,602 (Note: France sales figures for "If U Seek Amy" as of December 2009.); UK: 105,000 (Note: United Kingdom sales figures for "If U Seek Amy" as of October 2010.)	RIAA: 2× Platinum; ARIA: Gold; BPI: Gold; RMNZ: Gold	Circus
"Radar"	2009	88	46	65	44	—	32	32	8	—	46	US: 481,000 (Note: United States sales figures for "Radar'" as of July 2010.)	RIAA: Platinum	Circus
"3"	2009	1	6	1	10	18	7	12	2	8	7	US: 2,400,000 (Note: United States sales figures for "3" as of July 2016.); FRA: 28,572 (Note: France sales figures for "3" as of December 2009.); UK: 145,000 (Note: United Kingdom sales figures for "3" as of October 2010.)	RIAA: 3× Platinum; ARIA: Platinum; BPI: Silver; MC: 2× Platinum; RMNZ: Gold	The Singles Collection
"—" denotes items which did not chart or was not released in that territory.

=== 2010s ===
List of singles in the 2010s decade, showing selected chart positions, sales figures, and certifications
Title	Year	Peak chart positions										Sales	Certifications	Album
Title	Year	US	AUS	CAN	FRA	GER	IRE	NZ	SWE	SWI	UK	Sales	Certifications	Album
"Hold It Against Me"	2011	1	4	1	31	23	5	1	9	7	6	US: 1,600,000 (Note: United States sales figures for "Hold It Against Me" as of July 2016.)	RIAA: 2× Platinum; ARIA: Platinum; BPI: Silver; IFPI SWE: 2× Platinum; RMNZ: Gold	Femme Fatale
"Till the World Ends" (solo or featuring Nicki Minaj and Kesha)	2011	3	8	4	8	27	7	10	4	7	21	US: 3,000,000 (Note: United States sales figures for "Till the World Ends" as of July 2016.); FRA: 104,800 (Note: France sales figures for "Till the World Ends" as of December 2011.); UK: 177,400 (Note: United Kingdom sales figures for "Till the World Ends" as of August 2016.)	RIAA: 4× Platinum; ARIA: 2× Platinum; BPI: Silver; IFPI SWE: 3× Platinum; IFPI SWI: Gold; RMNZ: Gold	Femme Fatale
"S&M" (remix) (Rihanna featuring Britney Spears)	2011	1	—	—	—	—	—	—	—	—	—		RIAA: Gold; IFPI SWE: 3× Platinum	Non-album single
"I Wanna Go"	2011	7	31	5	5	32	41	22	30	27	111	US: 1,780,000 (Note: United States sales figures for "I Wanna Go" as of July 2016.); FRA: 83,700 (Note: France sales figures for "I Wanna Go" as of December 2011.)	RIAA: 2× Platinum; ARIA: Gold; IFPI SWE: Platinum	Femme Fatale
"Criminal"	2011	55	—	16	13	—	—	—	36	33	—	US: 279,000 (Note: United States sales figures for "Criminal" as of June 2012.)	RIAA: Platinum; RMNZ: Gold	Femme Fatale
"Scream & Shout" (with will.i.am)	2012	3	2	1	1	1	1	1	2	1	1	US: 3,000,000 (Note: United States sales figures for "Scream & Shout" as of July 2016.); FRA: 211,200 (Note: France sales figures for "Scream and Shout" as of December 2014.); UK: 1,300,000 (Note: United Kingdom sales figures for "Scream and Shout" as of August 2022.)	RIAA: 3× Platinum; ARIA: 6× Platinum; BPI: 2× Platinum; BVMI: 4× Platinum; GLF: 3× Platinum; IFPI SWI: 2× Platinum; RMNZ: 3× Platinum; SNEP: Platinum	#willpower
"Ooh La La"	2013	54	—	37	73	86	—	—	—	—	72			The Smurfs 2: Music from and Inspired By
"Work Bitch"	2013	12	22	5	6	36	13	28	30	26	7	US: 967,000 (Note: United States sales figures for "Work Bitch" as of July 2016.); FRA: 34,200 (Note: France sales figures for "Work Bitch" as of December 2013.)	RIAA: 2× Platinum; ARIA: Platinum; BPI: Gold; IFPI SWE: Platinum; MC: Platinum; RMNZ: Platinum	Britney Jean
"Perfume"	2013	76	61	70	34	78	36	—	—	74	—			Britney Jean
"Til It's Gone"	2013	—	—	—	—	—	—	—	—	—	—			Britney Jean
"It Should Be Easy" (featuring will.i.am)	2014	—	—	88	121	—	—	—	—	71	—			Britney Jean
"Pretty Girls" (with Iggy Azalea)	2015	29	27	16	25	88	60	—	—	—	16		RIAA: Gold	Non-album single
"Tom's Diner" (Giorgio Moroder featuring Britney Spears)	2015	—	—	—	146	—	—	—	—	—	—			Déjà Vu
"Make Me" (featuring G-Eazy)	2016	17	39	20	11	71	51	— (Note: "Make Me" did not enter the NZ Top 40 Singles Chart, but peaked at number 3 on the NZ Heatseekers Singles Chart.)	— (Note: "Make Me" did not enter the Swedish Singellista Chart, but peaked at number 5 on the Swedish Heatseekers Singles Chart.)	58	42		RIAA: Platinum; MC: Gold	Glory
"Slumber Party" (featuring Tinashe)	2016	86	—	51	121	—	—	—	—	—	— (Note: "Slumber Party" did not enter the UK Singles Chart, but peaked at number 73 on the UK Singles Sales Chart.)			Glory
"—" denotes items which did not chart in that country.

=== 2020s ===
List of singles in the 2020s decade, showing selected chart positions and certifications
Title	Year	Peak chart positions										Sales	Certifications	Album
Title	Year	US	AUS	CAN	FRA	GER	HUN	NZ	SWE	SWI	UK	Sales	Certifications	Album
"Mood Ring"	2020	— (Note: "Mood Ring" did not enter the Billboard Hot 100, but peaked at number 23 on the Bubbling Under Hot 100 chart.)	—	— (Note: "Mood Ring" did not enter the Canadian Hot 100, but peaked at number 32 on the Canada Digital Song Sales chart.)	—	— (Note: "Mood Ring" did not enter the German Singles Chart, but peaked at number 60 on the Germany Digital Singles Sales chart.)	3	—	—	—	— (Note: "Mood Ring" did not enter the UK Singles Chart, but peaked at number 18 on the UK Singles Downloads Chart.)			Glory (Note: "Mood Ring" only appears on the Japanese deluxe version and on both 2020 reissues of the standard and deluxe versions of Glory; "Swimming in the Stars" and "Matches" only appears on the 2020 reissue of the deluxe version of the album.)
"Swimming in the Stars"	2020	— (Note: "Swimming in the Stars" did not enter the Billboard Hot 100, but peaked at number 18 on the Digital Song Sales chart.)	—	— (Note: "Swimming in the Stars" did not enter the Canadian Hot 100, but peaked at number 25 on the Canada Digital Song Sales chart.)	—	— (Note: "Swimming in the Stars" did not enter the German Singles Chart, but peaked at number 28 on the Germany Digital Singles Sales chart.)	13	— (Note: "Swimming in the Stars" did not enter the NZ Top 40 Singles Chart, but peaked at number 37 on the NZ Hot Singles Chart.)	—	—	— (Note: "Swimming in the Stars" did not enter the UK Singles Chart, but peaked at number 36 on the UK Singles Downloads Chart.)			Glory
"Matches" (with Backstreet Boys)	2020	— (Note: "Matches" did not enter the Billboard Hot 100, but peaked at number 11 on the Digital Song Sales chart.)	—	— (Note: "Matches" did not enter the Canadian Hot 100, but peaked at number 7 on the Canada Digital Song Sales chart.)	—	— (Note: "Matches" did not enter the German Singles Chart, but peaked at number 22 on the Germany Digital Singles Sales chart.)	22	— (Note: "Matches" did not enter the NZ Top 40 Singles Chart, but peaked at number 40 on the NZ Hot Singles Chart.)	—	—	— (Note: "Matches" did not enter the UK Singles Chart, but peaked at number 48 on the UK Singles Downloads chart.)			Glory
"Hold Me Closer" (with Elton John)	2022	6	1	3	65	31	1	4	21	7	3	US: 111,000 (Note: United States sales figures for "Hold Me Closer" as of May 2023.)	RIAA: Platinum; ARIA: Gold; BPI: Platinum; BVMI: Gold; IFPI SWI: Gold; MC: 3× Platinum; RMNZ: 2× Platinum; SNEP: Platinum	The Lockdown Sessions (Note: "Hold Me Closer" only appears on the reissue of John's The Lockdown Sessions.)
"Mind Your Business" (with will.i.am)	2023	— (Note: "Mind Your Business" did not enter the Billboard Hot 100, but peaked at number 12 on the Digital Song Sales chart.)	—	— (Note: "Mind Your Business" did not enter the Canadian Hot 100, but peaked at number 16 on the Canada Digital Song Sales chart.)	—	— (Note: "Mind Your Business" did not enter the German Singles Chart, but peaked at number 8 on the Germany Digital Singles Sales chart.)	—	— (Note: "Mind Your Business" did not enter the NZ Top 40 Singles Chart, but peaked at number 27 on the NZ Hot Singles Chart.)	—	—	— (Note: "Mind Your Business" did not enter the UK Singles Chart, but peaked at number 11 on the UK Singles Sales chart.)			Non-album single
"—" denotes items which did not chart in that country.

=== Promotional singles ===
List of promotional singles, with selected chart positions and certifications, showing year released and album name
Title	Year	Peak chart positions										Sales	Certifications	Album
Title	Year	CIS	DEN	FIN	FRA	IRE	POL	SWE	SWI	UK	WW	Sales	Certifications	Album
"Right Now (Taste the Victory)"	2001	—	—	—	—	—	—	—	—	—	—			Ask for More
"I've Just Begun (Having My Fun)"	2003	—	—	—	—	—	—	—	—	—	—			In the Zone
"And Then We Kiss"	2005	12	—	—	—	—	—	—	—	—	—			B in the Mix: The Remixes
"Private Show"	2016	—	—	—	141	—	—	—	—	—	—			Glory
"Clumsy"	2016	—	—	—	142	—	—	—	—	—	—			Glory
"Do You Wanna Come Over?"	2016	—	—	—	134	—	—	—	—	—	—			Glory
"My Only Wish (This Year)"	2020	125	14	23	84	47	20	41	24	59	54	KOR: 39,344 (Note: South Korea sales figures for "My Only Wish (This Year)" as of December 2011.)	RIAA: Gold; ARIA: Gold; BPI: Platinum; IFPI DEN: 3× Platinum; RMNZ: Gold	Platinum Christmas
"Toxic Pony" (with Altégo and Ginuwine)	2022	—	—	83	—	—	—	—	—	—	—	US: 11,000 (Note: United States sales figures for "Toxic Pony" as of May 2023.)	RMNZ: Gold	Non-album promotional single
"Toxic Las Vegas" (Jamieson Shaw remix) (with Elvis Presley)	2023	—	—	—	—	—	—	—	—	—	—			Elvis: Original Motion Picture Soundtrack (deluxe)
"She'll Never Be Me"	2026	—	—	—	—	—	—	—	—	— (Note: "She'll Never Be Me" did not enter the UK Singles Chart, but peaked at number 29 on the UK Singles Sales chart.)	—			Britney: 25th Anniversary Edition
"—" denotes items which did not chart in that country.

=== Charity singles ===
List of charity singles, with selected chart positions, showing year released and album name
Title	Year	Peak chart positions									Album
Title	Year	US	AUS	FRA	GER	IRE	NZ	SWE	SWI	UK	Album
"What's Going On" (as part of Artists Against AIDS Worldwide)	2001	27	38	55	35	8	18	19	16	6	Non-album charity singles
"Hands" (as part of various artists)	2016	—	—	—	—	—	—	—	—	—	Non-album charity singles
"—" denotes items which did not chart in that country.

== Other charted songs ==
List of songs, with selected chart positions, showing year released and album name
Title	Year	Peak chart positions										Sales	Album
Title	Year	US	US Dance Elec.	US Pop 100	US Pop Dig.	CAN	CIS	FRA	KOR	SWE	UK	Sales	Album
"I Run Away"	2001	—	—	—	—	—	140	—	—	—	—		Britney
"Toy Soldier"	2007	—	—	—	—	— (Note: "Toy Soldier" did not enter the Billboard's Canadian Hot 100, but peaked at 59 on the Canadian Digital Song Sales chart.)	—	—	—	—	—		Blackout
"Everybody"	2007	—	—	—	—	81	88	—	—	—	—		Blackout
"Out from Under"	2008	— (Note: "Out from Under" did not enter the Billboard Hot 100, but peaked at number 19 on the Bubbling Under Hot 100 chart.)	—	—	—	—	48	—	—	31	—		Circus
"Kill the Lights"	2008	— (Note: "Kill the Lights" did not enter the Billboard Hot 100, but peaked at number 11 on the Bubbling Under Hot 100 chart.)	—	69	—	69	—	—	—	—	—		Circus
"Shattered Glass"	2008	70	—	57	—	75	—	—	—	—	192		Circus
"Unusual You"	2008	—	—	80	—	—	—	—	—	—	—		Circus
"Mmm Papi"	2008	—	—	94	—	—	—	—	—	—	—		Circus
"Lace and Leather"	2008	—	—	84	—	—	—	—	—	—	—		Circus
"Inside Out"	2011	—	—	*	—	—	—	—	— (Note: "Inside Out" did not enter the Circle Cumulative Digital Chart, but peaked at number 59 on the Circle Foreign Digital Chart.)	—	—	KOR: 21,509 (Note: South Korea sales figures for "Inside Out" as of 2011.)	Femme Fatale
"How I Roll"	2011	—	—	*	—	—	—	—	— (Note: "How I Roll" did not enter the Circle Cumulative Digital Chart, but peaked at number 32 on the Circle Foreign Digital Chart.)	—	—	KOR: 18,751 (Note: South Korea sales figures for "How I Roll" as of 2011.)	Femme Fatale
"(Drop Dead) Beautiful" (featuring Sabi)	2011	—	— (Note: "(Drop Dead) Beautiful" did not enter the Dance/Electronic Songs chart, but peaked at number 14 at Dance/Electronic Digital Song Sales chart.)	*	—	—	—	—	— (Note: "(Drop Dead) Beautiful" did not enter the Circle Cumulative Digital Chart, but peaked at number 41 on the Circle Foreign Digital Chart.)	—	—	KOR: 7,500 (Note: South Korea sales figures for "(Drop Dead) Beautiful" as of 2011.)	Femme Fatale
"Seal It with a Kiss"	2011	—	— (Note: "Seal It with a Kiss" did not enter the Dance/Electronic Songs chart, but peaked at number 33 at Dance/Electronic Digital Song Sales chart.)	*	—	—	—	—	— (Note: "Seal It with a Kiss" did not enter the Circle Cumulative Digital Chart, but peaked at number 61 on the Circle Foreign Digital Chart.)	—	—	KOR: 7,160 (Note: South Korea sales figures for "Seal It with a Kiss" as of 2011.)	Femme Fatale
"Big Fat Bass" (featuring will.i.am)	2011	—	— (Note: "Big Fat Bass" did not enter the Dance/Electronic Songs chart, but peaked at number 18 at Dance/Electronic Digital Song Sales chart.)	*	—	—	—	—	— (Note: "Big Fat Bass" did not enter the Circle Cumulative Digital Chart, but peaked at number 31 on the Circle Foreign Digital Chart.)	—	—	KOR: 28,476 (Note: South Korea sales figures for "Big Fat Bass" as of 2011.)	Femme Fatale
"Trouble for Me"	2011	—	—	*	—	—	—	—	— (Note: "Trouble for Me" did not enter the Circle Cumulative Digital Chart, but peaked at number 58 on the Circle Foreign Digital Chart.)	—	—	KOR: 7,396 (Note: South Korea sales figures for "Trouble for Me" as of 2011.)	Femme Fatale
"Trip to Your Heart"	2011	—	— (Note: "Trip to Your Heart" did not enter the Dance/Electronic Songs chart, but peaked at number 40 at Dance/Electronic Digital Song Sales chart.)	*	—	—	—	—	— (Note: "Trip to Your Heart" did not enter the Circle Cumulative Digital Chart, but peaked at number 63 on the Circle Foreign Digital Chart.)	—	—	KOR: 6,662 (Note: South Korea sales figures for "Trip to Your Heart" as of 2011.)	Femme Fatale
"Gasoline"	2011	—	—	*	—	—	—	—	— (Note: "Gasoline" did not enter the Circle Cumulative Digital Chart, but peaked at number 27 on the Circle Foreign Digital Chart.)	—	—	KOR: 27,845 (Note: South Korea sales figures for "Gasoline" as of 2011.)	Femme Fatale
"Up n' Down"	2011	— (Note: "Up n' Down" did not enter the Billboard Hot 100, but peaked at number ten on the Bubbling Under Hot 100 chart.)	— (Note: "Up n' Down" did not enter the Dance/Electronic Songs chart, but peaked at number five at Dance/Electronic Digital Song Sales chart.)	*	41	—	—	—	127	—	—	KOR: 116,030 (Note: South Korea sales figures for "Up n' Down" as of 2011.)	Femme Fatale
"Selfish"	2011	—	12	*	—	— (Note: "Selfish" did not enter the Billboard's Canadian Hot 100, but peaked at 11 on the Canadian Digital Song Sales chart.)	—	—	—	—	— (Note: "Selfish" did not enter the UK Singles Chart, but peaked at number 13 on the UK Singles Sales chart.)	US: ~10,000	Femme Fatale
"Scary"	2011	—	—	*	—	—	—	—	148	—	— (Note: "Scary" did not enter the UK Singles Chart Top 100, but peaked at number 57 on the UK Singles Downloads Chart Top 100 in 2025, after renewed interest in the song.)	KOR: 220,356 (Note: South Korea sales figures for "Scary" as of 2011.)	Femme Fatale
"SMS (Bangerz)" (Miley Cyrus featuring Britney Spears)	2013	— (Note: "SMS (Bangerz)" did not enter the Billboard Hot 100, but peaked at number ten on the Bubbling Under Hot 100 chart.)	—	*	29	—	—	—	—	—	157		Bangerz
"Alien"	2013	— (Note: "Alien" did not enter the Billboard Hot 100, but peaked at number eight on the Bubbling Under Hot 100 chart.)	—	*	—	—	—	147	— (Note: "Alien" did not enter the Circle Cumulative Digital Chart, but peaked at number 90 on the Circle Foreign Digital Chart.)	—	—	KOR: 2,742 (Note: South Korea first week sales figures for "Alien".)	Britney Jean
"Body Ache"	2013	—	20	*	—	—	—	—	— (Note: "Body Ache" did not enter the Circle Cumulative Digital Chart, but peaked at number 20 on the Circle Foreign Digital Chart.)	—	—	KOR: 8,303 (Note: South Korea first month sales figures for "Body Ache".)	Britney Jean
"Passenger"	2013	—	—	*	—	—	—	—	— (Note: "Passenger" did not enter the Circle Cumulative Digital Chart, but peaked at number 126 on the Circle Foreign Digital Chart.)	—	—	KOR: 2,254 (Note: South Korea first week sales figures for "Passenger".)	Britney Jean
"Chillin' with You" (featuring Jamie Lynn)	2013	—	—	*	—	—	—	—	— (Note: "Chillin' with You" did not enter the Circle Cumulative Digital Chart, but peaked at number 120 on the Circle Foreign Digital Chart.)	—	—	KOR: 2,302 (Note: South Korea first week sales figures for "Chillin' with You".)	Britney Jean
"Don't Cry"	2013	—	—	*	—	—	—	—	— (Note: "Don't Cry" did not enter the Circle Cumulative Digital Chart, but peaked at number 116 on the Circle Foreign Digital Chart.)	—	—	KOR: 2,371 (Note: South Korea first week sales figures for "Don't Cry".)	Britney Jean
"—" denotes items which did not chart in that country. "*" denotes the chart is discontinued.

== Guest appearances ==
List of non-single and non-charting guest appearances, with other performing artists, showing year released and album name
Title	Year	Other artist(s)	Album
"Like a Virgin / Hollywood Medley" (2003 MTV Video Music Awards Performance)	2003	Madonna, Christina Aguilera and Missy Elliott	Remixed & Revisited
"We Will Rock You"	2004	Beyoncé and P!nk	Pepsi Music 2004: Dare for More
"Follow Me" ≠	2005	Jamie Lynn Spears	Zoey 101
"PopoZão" ≠	2005	Kevin Federline	—N/a
"Crazy"	2006	Kevin Federline	Playing with Fire
"Britney Spears Calls Thrill"	2007	Thrill	hipOpera & tom foolery
"Like No One Else"	2007	Lil Wayne	R & Weezy R&B, Part 1
"Look Who's Talking" ≠	2009	BoA	BoA
"Whiplash" ≠	2011	Selena Gomez & the Scene	When the Sun Goes Down
"≠" indicates songs in which Britney Spears is only credited as songwriter.

== See also ==
- List of songs recorded by Britney Spears
- List of unreleased songs recorded by Britney Spears
- Britney Spears videography

== Footnotes ==
Notes for albums and songs

Notes for peak chart positions

== Bibliography ==
- Heard, Christopher (2010). Britney Spears: Menina perdida. Prumo Retratos. ISBN 978-85-7927-163-2.
