= Playlist: The Very Best of Britney Spears =

Greatest hits album by Britney Spears
- Released: November 6, 2012
- Recorded: 1998–2010
- Genre: Pop
- Length: 51:14
- Labels: Jive; Legacy
- Producers: Max Martin; Rami Yacoub; David Kreuger; Per Magnusson; The Neptunes; Bloodshy & Avant; Danja; Jim Beanz; The Outsyders; Dr. Luke; Billboard; Emily Wright; Shellback

Britney Spears chronology
Oops! I Did It Again: The Best of Britney Spears (2012)	Playlist: The Very Best of Britney Spears (2012)	The Essential Britney Spears (2013)

Playlist: The Very Best of Britney Spears is the fourth greatest hits album by American artist Britney Spears. It was released on November 6, 2012. The album contains a selection of remastered recordings, and is part of a series of similar Playlist albums issued by Legacy Recordings.

== Critical reception ==
Professional ratings
Review scores
Source	Rating
AllMusic	4.5/5 stars

Stephen Thomas Erlewine from AllMusic said the album "covers much of the same ground as 2009's The Singles Collection but does take into account 2011's Femme Fatale, adding "Till the World Ends" and "Hold It Against Me." What was cut from Singles is generally not missed, as the big songs are here—"Baby One More Time," "You Drive Me Crazy," "Oops...I Did It Again," "I'm a Slave 4 U," "Toxic"—making this arguably a preferable comp to its full-price predecessor."

== Commercial performance ==
The album debuted at number 111 on the Billboard 200 on the week of December 8, 2012 with 11,000 units sold. That week, it was priced for $1.99 at some retailers for a limited time. However, as the set was less than four weeks old, those sales were not counted, per Billboard's pricing policy, which did not affect other albums from the Playlist series, such as Playlist: The Very Best of Destiny's Child, which were older. As of 2020, it sold 170,000 units in the United States.

== Track listing ==
Playlist: The Very Best of Britney Spears track listing
No.	Title	Writer(s)	Original album	Length
1.	"...Baby One More Time"	Max Martin	...Baby One More Time	3:32
2.	"(You Drive Me) Crazy" (The Stop Remix!)	Jörgen Elofsson, Per Magnusson, David Kreuger, Martin	...Baby One More Time	3:17
3.	"Oops!... I Did It Again"	Martin, Rami Yacoub	Oops!... I Did It Again	3:31
4.	"Stronger"	Martin, Yacoub	Oops!... I Did It Again	3:23
5.	"I'm a Slave 4 U"	Chad Hugo, Pharrell Williams	Britney	3:25
6.	"Toxic"	Cathy Dennis, Christian Karlsson, Pontus Winnberg, Henrik Jonback	In the Zone	3:20
7.	"Gimme More"	Nate Hills, James Washington, Keri Hilson, Marcella Araica	Blackout	4:11
8.	"Womanizer"	The Outsyders	Circus	3:44
9.	"Hold It Against Me"	Martin, Lukasz Gottwald, Bonnie McKee	Femme Fatale	3:49
10.	"Till the World Ends"	Gottwald, Alexander Kronlund, Martin, Kesha Sebert	Femme Fatale	3:59
11.	"If U Seek Amy"	Martin, Shellback, Savan Kotecha, Kronlund	Circus	3:36
12.	"I Wanna Go"	Martin, Kotecha, Shellback	Femme Fatale	3:30
13.	"Piece of Me"	Karlsson, Winnberg, Klas Åhlund	Blackout	3:32
14.	"Circus" (Diplo Circus Remix)	Gottwald, Claude Kelly, Benjamin Levin	Previously unreleased on CD	4:25
Total length:				51:14

== Charts ==
Chart performance
Chart (2012)	Peak position
US Billboard 200	111

== Release history ==
Release history
Region	Date	Format(s)	Label(s)	Ref.
Various	November 6, 2012	CD	Jive	
