= Oops! I Did It Again: The Best of Britney Spears =

Greatest hits album by Britney Spears
- Released: June 15, 2012
- Recorded: 1997–2008
- Genre: Pop
- Length: 57:02
- Label: Camden
- Producers: Bloodshy & Avant; Larry "Rock" Campbell; Kara DioGuardi; Eric Foster White; Brian Kierulf; Kristian Lundin; Steve Lunt; Penelope Magnet; Max Martin; The Neptunes; Wade Robson; Joshua Schwartz; Guy Sigsworth; Britney Spears; Tricky Stewart; Justin Timberlake; Rami Yacoub

Britney Spears chronology
B in the Mix: The Remixes Vol. 2 (2011)	Oops! I Did It Again: The Best of Britney Spears (2012)	Playlist: The Very Best of Britney Spears (2012)

Oops! I Did It Again: The Best of Britney Spears (stylized in all lowercase) is the third greatest hits album by American singer Britney Spears. It was released on June 15, 2012 through the Camden label. The album contains some early singles but is considerably filled with album and bonus tracks from her studio albums ...Baby One More Time (1999), Oops!... I Did It Again (2000), Britney (2001), In the Zone (2003) and Circus (2008). The album contains no tracks from Blackout (2007) nor Femme Fatale (2011). Its issuance with no official press release or announcement took both fans and critics by surprise. When fans on Twitter asked about the album, global distributor Sony Music stated they had no knowledge of the album. It was not released in the United States.

== Critical reception ==
Oops! I Did It Again: The Best of Britney Spears is, according to Stephen Thomas Erlewine of AllMusic, "not terrible, but not the best-of and not worth the time of most fans, either". He called the album "not so much a best-of collection" of Spears' career, but rather "an odd recap of her first act". Erlewine declared that while the album does include major hits such as "...Baby One More Time" (1998) and "I'm a Slave 4 U" (2001), it "misses the mark" in excluding "(You Drive Me) Crazy" (1999) and "Toxic" (2004). He noted that mentioned songs are excluded in favor of album cuts and songs that appeared as bonus tracks on international editions of her albums.

== Track listing ==
Oops! I Did It Again: The Best of Britney Spears track listing
No.	Title	Writer(s)	Original album	Length
1.	"Oops!... I Did It Again"	Max Martin; Rami	Oops!... I Did It Again, 2000	3:34
2.	"...Baby One More Time"	Martin	...Baby One More Time, 1999	3:31
3.	"I'm a Slave 4 U"	Charles Edward Hugo; Pharrell Williams	Britney, 2001	3:26
4.	"Born to Make You Happy" (Radio edit)	Kristian Lundin; Andreas Carlsson	...Baby One More Time	3:36
5.	"Cinderella"	Britney Spears; Martin; Rami	Britney	3:40
6.	"Brave New Girl"	Spears; Kara DioGuardi; Brian Kierulf; Joshua Schwartz	In the Zone, 2003	3:29
7.	"The Hook Up"	Spears; Penelope Magnet; Christopher Stewart; Thabiso Nikhereanye	In the Zone	3:55
8.	"Don't Hang Up"	Spears; Kierulf; Schwartz	In the Zone	4:00
9.	"One Kiss from You"	Steve Lunt	Oops!... I Did It Again	3:24
10.	"Anticipating"	Spears; Kierulf; Schwartz	Britney	3:16
11.	"What It's Like to Be Me"	Wade J. Robson; Justin Timberlake	Britney	2:52
12.	"My Baby"	Spears; Guy Sigsworth	Circus, 2008	3:20
13.	"Out from Under"	Arnthor Birgisson; Wayne Hector; Shelly Peiken	Circus	3:55
14.	"You Got It All"	Rupert Holmes	Oops!... I Did It Again	4:11
15.	"Showdown"	Spears; Cathy Dennis; Henrik Jonback; Christian Karlsson; Rich Tapper; Pontus Winnberg	In the Zone	3:18
16.	"That's Where You Take Me"	Spears; Kierulf; Schwartz	Britney	3:34
Total length:				57:02

== Release history ==
Release history
Region	Date	Format(s)	Label(s)	Ref.
Spain	June 15, 2012	Digital download	Sony Music	
United Kingdom	June 18, 2012	CD	Camden	
Canada	June 19, 2012	CD	Sony Music	
France	July 2, 2012	CD	Sony Music	
Germany	August 24, 2012	CD	Sony Music	
Greece	August 24, 2012	CD	Sony Music	
