= List of number-one albums of 2000 (Canada) =

These are the Canadian number-one albums of 2000.

== RPM ==
Issue date	Album	Artist
January 3	All the Way... A Decade of Song	Céline Dion
January 10	MuchDance 2000	Various Artists
January 17	Supernatural	Santana
January 24	Big Shiny Tunes 4	Various Artists
January 31	Supernatural	Santana
February 7	Supernatural	Santana
February 14	Club Cutz 303	Chris Sheppard
February 21	Supernatural	Santana
February 28	Supernatural	Santana
March 6	Supernatural	Santana
March 13	Supernatural	Santana
March 20	Supernatural	Santana
March 27	Supernatural	Santana
April 3	No Strings Attached	'N Sync
April 10	No Strings Attached	'N Sync
April 17	No Strings Attached	'N Sync
April 24	On How Life Is	Macy Gray
May 1	On How Life Is	Macy Gray
May 8	On How Life Is	Macy Gray
May 15	The Heat	Toni Braxton
May 22	Mission: Impossible II	Soundtrack
May 29	Oops!... I Did It Again	Britney Spears
June 5	The Marshall Mathers LP	Eminem
June 12	The Marshall Mathers LP	Eminem
June 19	The Marshall Mathers LP	Eminem
June 26	The Marshall Mathers LP	Eminem
July 3	The Marshall Mathers LP	Eminem
July 10	The Marshall Mathers LP	Eminem
July 17	The Marshall Mathers LP	Eminem
July 24	The Marshall Mathers LP	Eminem
July 31	The Marshall Mathers LP	Eminem
August 7	The Marshall Mathers LP	Eminem
August 14	The Marshall Mathers LP	Eminem
August 21	The Marshall Mathers LP	Eminem
August 28	The Marshall Mathers LP	Eminem
September 4	The Marshall Mathers LP	Eminem
September 11	Now! 5	Various Artists
September 18	Now! 5	Various Artists
September 25	Maroon	Barenaked Ladies
October 2	Music	Madonna
October 9	Music	Madonna
October 16	Kid A	Radiohead
October 23	Kid A	Radiohead
October 30	Chocolate Starfish and the Hot Dog Flavored Water	Limp Bizkit
November 6	Chocolate Starfish and the Hot Dog Flavored Water	Limp Bizkit
November 13	Chocolate Starfish and the Hot Dog Flavored Water	Limp Bizkit

== Billboard ==
Issue date	Album	Artist
November 18	All That You Can't Leave Behind	U2
November 25	All That You Can't Leave Behind	U2
December 2	1	The Beatles
December 9	Black & Blue	Backstreet Boys
December 16	Black & Blue	Backstreet Boys
December 23	1	The Beatles
December 30	1	The Beatles

== See also ==
- List of Canadian number-one singles of 2000
