= The Essential Britney Spears =

Greatest hits album by Britney Spears
- Released: August 20, 2013
- Recorded: 1998–2012
- Genre: Pop
- Length: 117:08
- Label: RCA
- Producers: Jeffrey James; Darren Salmieri

Britney Spears chronology
Playlist: The Very Best of Britney Spears (2012)	The Essential Britney Spears (2013)	Britney Jean (2013)

The Essential Britney Spears is the fifth greatest hits album by American singer Britney Spears. It was released on August 20, 2013, by RCA Records and Legacy Recordings, initially as a Walmart exclusive. It was later released on digital platforms the following year. The compilation was produced by Jeffrey James and Darren Salmieri, and it was mastered by Seann Brennan at Battery Studios in New York.

== Critical reception ==
Professional ratings
Review scores
Source	Rating
AllMusic	4.5/5 stars

Stephen Thomas Erlewine of AllMusic praised the length of the compilation, noting "Where other Britney compilations ran no longer than a single CD, this is a double-disc set with over 30 tracks -- more than enough space for all of her hit American singles", and noticed the absence of singles such as "Born to Make You Happy" or "Don't Let Me Be the Last to Know". He also compared The Essential with its predecessor, indicating that "Skeptics might suspect shorter is better for Britney -- and those looking for a quick blast of hits will be well-served by Playlist and pointed the portrayal of Spears's career being reflected in the two discs of this compilation: "this double-disc set reveals that she had two strong, distinct phases to her career: the bubblegum pop ingénue of the new millennium, followed by the blackout club diva of ten years later."

== Commercial performance ==
The Essential Britney Spears debuted on the US Billboard 200 at number 185 on the week of March 11, 2017, four years after its original release. It debuted at number 95 on the Billboard Canadian Albums Chart on April 25, 2020, and it peaked at number 37 on the week of October 16, 2021, spending a total of 27 weeks on the chart.

== Track listing ==
Disc one
No.	Title	Writer(s)	Length
1.	"...Baby One More Time"	Max Martin	3:31
2.	"Sometimes"	Jörgen Elofsson	3:56
3.	"(You Drive Me) Crazy" (The Stop! Remix)	Elofsson, Per Magnusson, David Kreuger, Martin	3:17
4.	"From the Bottom of My Broken Heart"	Eric Foster White	4:34
5.	"Oops!... I Did It Again"	Martin, Rami Yacoub	3:31
6.	"Lucky"	Martin, Yacoub, Alexander Kronlund	3:25
7.	"Stronger"	Martin, Yacoub	3:24
8.	"I'm a Slave 4 U"	Chad Hugo, Pharrell Williams	3:24
9.	"I'm Not a Girl, Not Yet a Woman"	Martin, Yacoub, Dido Armstrong	3:51
10.	"Overprotected" (The Darkchild Remix)	Martin, Yacoub	3:20
11.	"Boys" (The Co-Ed Remix) (featuring Pharrell Williams)	Hugo, Williams	3:46
12.	"Me Against the Music" (featuring Madonna)	Britney Spears, Madonna, Christopher "Tricky" Stewart, Thabiso "Tab" Nikhereanye, Penelope Magnet, Terius Nash, Gary O'Bryan	3:45
13.	"Toxic"	Cathy Dennis, Christian Karlsson, Pontus Winnberg, Henrik Jonback	3:19
14.	"Everytime"	Spears, Annet Artani	3:50
15.	"Outrageous"	R. Kelly, Trickster, Magnet	3:27
Total length:			54:20

Disc two
No.	Title	Writer(s)	Length
1.	"My Prerogative"	Bobby Brown, Aaron Hall, Teddy Riley	3:33
2.	"Do Somethin'"	Karlsson, Winnberg, Jonback, Angela Hunte	3:23
3.	"Gimme More"	Nate Hills, James Washington, Keri Hilson, Marcella Araica	4:11
4.	"Piece of Me"	Karlsson, Winnberg, Klas Åhlund	3:32
5.	"Radar"	Ashton Cole, Jonback, Balewa Muhammad, Candice Nelson, Ezekiel "Zeke" Lewis, Patrick "J. Que" Smith	3:49
6.	"Break the Ice"	Hills, Washington, Hilson, Araica	3:15
7.	"Hot as Ice"	Faheem "T-Pain" Najm, Hills, Araica	3:17
8.	"Womanizer"	The Outsyders	3:44
9.	"Circus"	Lukasz Gottwald, Claude Kelly, Benjamin Levin	3:11
10.	"If U Seek Amy"	Martin, Shellback, Savan Kotecha, Kronlund	3:36
11.	"Out from Under"	Shelly Peiken, Arnthor Birgisson, Wayne Hector	3:54
12.	"3"	Martin, Karl Schuster, Tiffany Amber	3:25
13.	"Hold It Against Me"	Martin, Gottwald, Bonnie McKee	3:49
14.	"Till the World Ends"	Martin, Gottwald, Kronlund, Kesha Sebert	3:58
15.	"I Wanna Go"	Martin, Kotecha, Shellback	3:30
16.	"Criminal"	Martin, Shellback, Amber	3:45
17.	"Scream & Shout" (will.i.am and Britney Spears)	Jean-Baptiste Kouame, Tulisa Contostavlos, Jef Martens, William Adams	4:13
Total length:			62:05

== Charts ==
=== Weekly charts ===
Weekly chart performance
Chart (2017–2023)	Peak position
Canadian Albums (Billboard)	37
Greek Albums (IFPI)	30
Irish Albums (IRMA)	80
South Korean Albums (Gaon)	90
South Korean International Albums (Gaon)	6
US Billboard 200	185

=== Monthly charts ===
Monthly chart performance
Chart (2014)	Peak position
South Korean International Albums (Gaon)	41

== Certifications and sales ==
Certifications and sales
Region	Certification	Certified units/sales
New Zealand (RMNZ)	2× Platinum	30,000^{‡}
United Kingdom (BPI)	Silver	60,000^{‡}
United States	—	60,000
^{‡} Sales+streaming figures based on certification alone.

== Release history ==
Release history and formats
Country	Date	Format	Label
United States	August 20, 2013	CD; digital download	RCA; Legacy
Various	July 29, 2014	Digital download	RCA; Legacy
