= ...Baby One More Time (album) =

- Standard cover (Note: used for North American pressings, digital editions, and vinyl pressings)

Studio album by Britney Spears
- Released: January 12, 1999
- Recorded: November 1997 – June 1998
- Studios: 4MW East (New Jersey); Battery (New York); Cheiron (Stockholm)
- Genres: Pop; bubblegum pop; dance-pop; teen pop
- Length: 42:20
- Label: Jive
- Producers: All Seeing I; Jörgen Elofsson; David Kreuger; Kristian Lundin; Per Magnusson; Max Martin; Rami; Eric Foster White

Britney Spears chronology
...Baby One More Time (1999)	Oops!... I Did It Again (2000)

Alternative cover
- International cover (Note: Japanese pressings cover features Spears posing differently.)

Singles from ...Baby One More Time
- 1. "...Baby One More Time" Released: September 29, 1998; 2. "Sometimes" Released: April 6, 1999; 3. "(You Drive Me) Crazy" Released: August 24, 1999; 4. "Born to Make You Happy" Released: December 6, 1999; 5. "From the Bottom of My Broken Heart" Released: December 14, 1999

...Baby One More Time is the debut studio album by American singer Britney Spears. It was released on January 12, 1999, by Jive Records. Spears had been a child performer on The All-New Mickey Mouse Club from 1993 to 1994, and was looking to expand her career as a teen singer. After being turned away by several record companies, Spears signed with Jive for a multi-album deal in 1997. She travelled to Sweden to collaborate with producers Max Martin and Rami Yacoub, who had been writing songs with producer Denniz Pop and others, for ...Baby One More Time. Their collaboration created a pop, bubblegum pop, dance-pop, and teen pop record, with Spears later saying that she felt excited when she heard it and knew it was going to be a hit record. The album was completed in June 1998.

Upon its release, ...Baby One More Time garnered mixed reviews from music critics, with many praising its commercial appeal but deeming it silly and premature. Despite its initial mixed reception, it helped Spears receive a nomination for Best New Artist at the 42nd Annual Grammy Awards (2000). Retrospectively, it has been hailed for its major impact on pop culture, and has been deemed one of the most influential pop records of all time. A massive global commercial success, it made Spears the fifth artist under the age of 18 to top the US Billboard 200. It has been certified 14× platinum (diamond) by the Recording Industry Association of America (RIAA). Spears's best-selling album, it has sold over 25 million copies worldwide, making it one of the best-selling albums of all time, as well as the best-selling debut album by a teenage female artist.

...Baby One More Time produced five singles. The lead single, "...Baby One More Time", brought Spears tremendous global success, reaching number one in most countries it charted in and becoming one of the best-selling physical singles of all time. In 2020, it was named the greatest debut single of all time by Rolling Stone. Subsequent singles "Sometimes" and "Born to Make You Happy" peaked within the top ten in most international countries while "(You Drive Me) Crazy" became Spears's second US Billboard Hot 100 top-ten hit. Spears heavily promoted the album through interviews and televised performances. Furthermore, she embarked on her first headlining concert tour, entitled ...Baby One More Time Tour (1999) and later continued with (You Drive Me) Crazy Tour (2000).

== Recording and production ==
"I had been in the studio for about six months listening and recording material, but I hadn't really heard a hit yet. When I started working with Max Martin in Sweden, he played the demo for 'Baby One More Time' for me, and I knew from the start it one was [sic] of those songs you want to hear again and again. It just felt really right. I went into the studio and did my own thing with it, trying to give it a little more attitude than the demo. In 10 days, I never even saw Sweden. We were so busy."

— Spears talking to Chuck Taylor of Billboard.

In June 1997, Spears was in talks with then-manager Lou Pearlman to join the female pop group Innosense. Her mother, Lynne Spears, asked family friend and entertainment lawyer Larry Rudolph for his opinion and submitted a tape of Spears singing over a Whitney Houston karaoke song along with some pictures. Rudolph decided to pitch her to record labels, which required a professional demo. He sent Spears an unused song from Toni Braxton; she rehearsed for a week and recorded in a studio with an audio engineer. Spears traveled from her hometown Kentwood, Louisiana, to New York City with the demo and met executives from four labels, returning to Kentwood the same day. Three rejected her, arguing audiences wanted pop bands such as the Backstreet Boys and the Spice Girls, and "there wasn't going to be another Madonna, another Debbie Gibson or another Tiffany." Two weeks later, executives from Jive Records returned calls to Rudolph. Jive's senior vice president of A&R Jeff Fenster stated: "It's very rare to hear someone that age who can deliver emotional content and commercial appeal. [...] For any artist, the motivation—the 'eye of the tiger'—is extremely important. And Britney had that."

Jive soon appointed Spears to work with producer Eric Foster White for a month, who reportedly shaped her voice from "lower and less poppy" delivery to "distinctively, unmistakably Britney." One of the first songs Spears recorded with Foster White was "From the Bottom of My Broken Heart", which was released as the album's 4th single. Foster White also produced "Autumn Goodbye", which was the B-side to Spears' debut single "...Baby One More Time". During the same session for "Autumn Goodbye", Spears and Foster White also worked on a song called "Love Is On", which ultimately did not make the album and was later given to Sharon Cuneta. Spears recorded a lot of material with Eric Foster White, such as "Autumn Goodbye", "E-Mail My Heart", "From the Bottom of My Broken Heart", "I'm So Curious", "I Will Still Love You", "Way It Is Loving You", "I'll Be There For You", "Soda Pop", "Thinkin' About You", "Nothing Less Than Real", "Wishing on a Falling Star" and a cover of "You Got It All" by the Jets. She also recorded a cover of Sonny & Cher's 1967 single "The Beat Goes On". White was responsible for the vocal recording and song production, while additional production was handled by English electronic music group All Seeing I. After hearing the material, Jive Records president Clive Calder ordered a full studio album.

Spears flew to Cheiron Studios in Stockholm, where half of ...Baby One More Time was recorded from May 1998, with producers Max Martin and Rami Yacoub, and contributions from others, including songwriting from Denniz Pop, who was too ill to attend any recording sessions. (Note: Denniz Pop had stomach cancer and died on August 30, 1998. Spears never met him.) Martin showed Spears and her management a track titled "Hit Me Baby One More Time", originally written for American group TLC, who had rejected it. Spears later said that she felt excited when she heard it and knew it was going to be a hit. "We at Jive said, 'This is a fuckin' smash'", revealed the label's A&R executive, Steven Lunt; however, other executives were concerned that the line "Hit Me" would condone domestic violence, and later revised it to "...Baby One More Time". Spears revealed that she "didn't do well at all the first day in the studio [recording the song], I was just too nervous. So I went out that night and had some fun. The next day I was completely relaxed and nailed it. You gotta be relaxed singing '... Baby One More Time'." By June 1998, the album had been completed.

== Music and lyrics ==
Spears originally envisioned "Sheryl Crow music, but younger – more adult contemporary" for ...Baby One More Time, but acquiesced to the wishes of her label, since "It made more sense to go pop, because I can dance to it—it's more me." The album opens with its lead single, "...Baby One More Time", a teen pop and dance-pop song beginning with a three-note motif in the bass range of the piano. Its opening was compared to many other songs, such as "We Will Rock You" (1977), "Start Me Up" (1981), "These Words" (2004) and the theme song of the film Jaws due to the fact the track "makes its presence known in exactly one second". According to Blender, "...Baby One More Time" is composed of "wah-wah guitar lines and EKG-machine bass-slaps". Claudia Mitchell and Jacqueline Reid-Walsh, authors of Girl Culture: Studying Girl Culture: A Readers' Guide (2008), observed that the lyrics of the song "gesture toward [Spears] longing for the return of an ex-boyfriend." "(You Drive Me) Crazy" runs through a moderately slow dance beat, and has an R&B melody mixed with edgy synthesized instrumentals. "Sometimes" is a ballad, which Spears begins with the lines "You tell me you're in love with me / That you can't take your pretty eyes away from me / It's not that I don't wanna stay / But every time you come too close I move away". Stephen Thomas Erlewine of AllMusic noted the song has "a catchy hook and endearing melody, with a reminiscent euro-dance rhythm."

"Soda Pop" draws influences from bubblegum pop and ragga, and features background vocals from co-writer Mikey Bassie. Spears' vocals on the fifth track, "Born to Make You Happy" span more than an octave. Its lyrics allude to a relationship that a woman desires to repair, not quite understanding what went wrong, as she comes to realize that "I don't know how to live without your love / I was born to make you happy". "From the Bottom of My Broken Heart" is a sentimental slow-tempo teen pop ballad. "I Will Be There" is a pop rock song featuring a guitar riff similar to Natalie Imbruglia's "Torn" (1997), with a "rousing chorus about standing by your man (or a best friend or a house pet)", as noted by Kyle Anderson of MTV. "E-Mail My Heart" is a sensitive piano ballad on which Spears sings: "E-mail me back / And say our love will stay alive". The cover of Sonny & Cher's 1967 single "The Beat Goes On" is influenced by bossa nova and trip hop, and features a sound similar to spy film themes. Among the bonus tracks included on select editions of the album is a cover of J'Son's 1996 song "I'll Never Stop Loving You".

== Cover art ==
The artwork for ...Baby One More Time was released in two distinct versions, which varied according to the market. The North American edition features Britney Spears kneeling against a pink background and received mixed responses from the press. In a retrospective on Spears's album covers, The Awl described the image as "generic and of its time", stating that it resembled "one of the promo shots mass-emailed to teen magazines, with a logo and album title slapped on in a 15-minute Photoshop session". The international edition presents a close-up of Spears with her hands clasped, an image that, according to Billboard, encapsulated how the singer was portrayed at the time, with the magazine referring to her as "the eternal teenager".

== Marketing ==
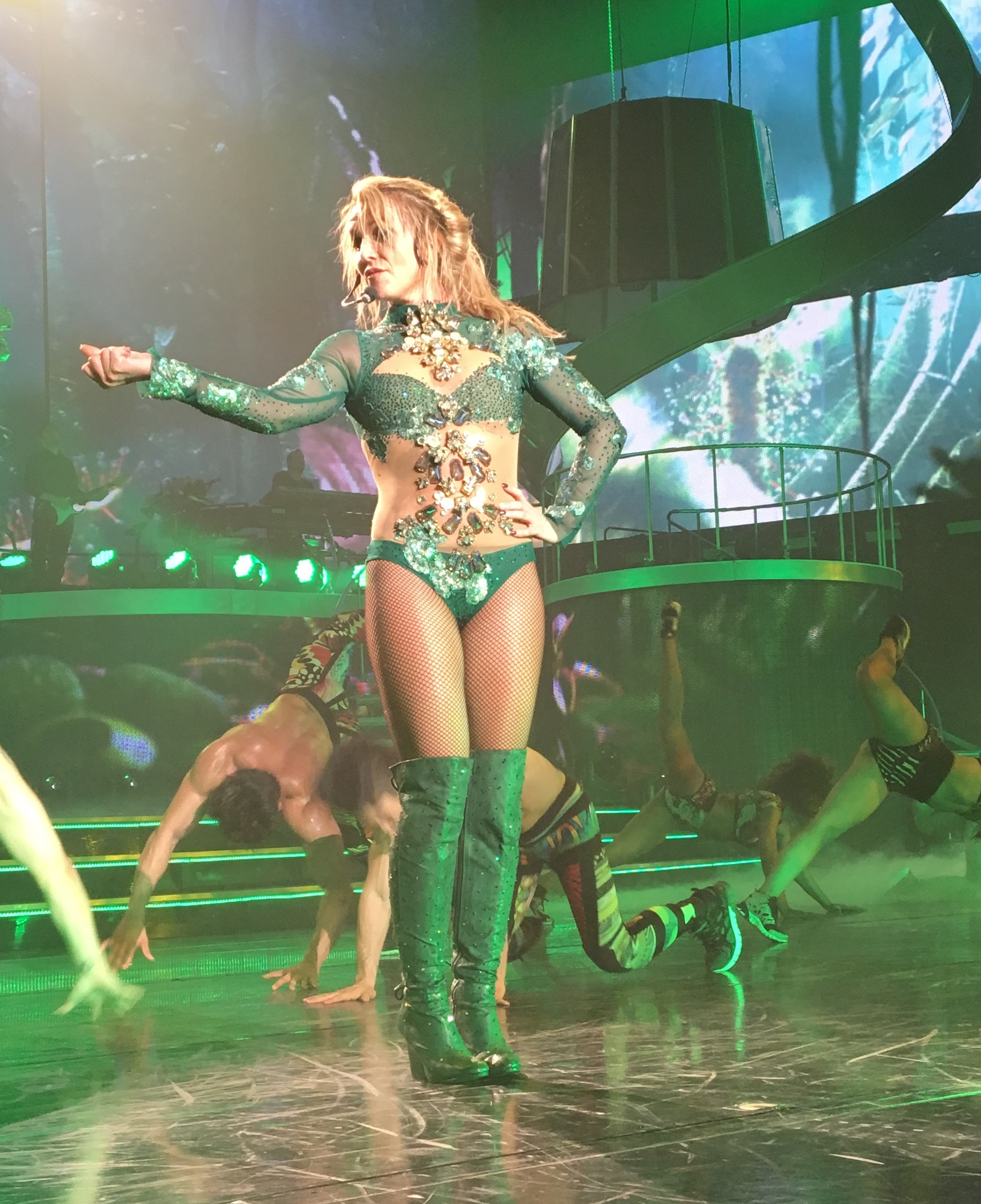
Spears performing "(You Drive Me) Crazy" at her Las Vegas residency show, Britney: Piece of Me, in February 2016

Promotion for ...Baby One More Time began in May 1998, when Spears performed "...Baby One More Time", "Sometimes" and "You Got It All" at the Singapore Jazz Festival. Subsequently, she embarked on the L'Oréal-sponsored promotional tour titled L'Oreal Hair Zone Mall Tour, visiting malls and food courts across North America from June 1998 to January 1999. In October 1998, "Soda Pop" appeared on the soundtrack for the television series Sabrina the Teenage Witch. The following month, the same track appeared on the soundtrack for the animated film Pokémon: The First Movie. "...Baby One More Time" debuted on MTV's and The Box's most-requested video charts in December. In the United States, ...Baby One More Time was originally set for an October 1998 release, but was pushed back to January 12, 1999, due to marketing issues, with its international release occurring within the following three months. Spears had appeared on Ricki Lake, The Howie Mandel Show, and was a presenter at the 1999 American Music Awards prior to the release. However, after hurting her knee in February, she rescheduled appearances on several shows, such as The Tonight Show with Jay Leno and Live with Regis and Kathie Lee. Additionally, she appeared on MTV Spring Break and on the hundredth episode of Nickelodeon's All That. After recovering, Spears embarked on another promotional schedule, appearing at the 1999 Kids' Choice Awards on May 1, Live with Regis and Kathie Lee on May 3, MTV's FANatic on May 12, and The Rosie O'Donnell Show on May 25.

Outside the US, Spears visited the German shows Wetten, dass..? and Top of the Pops on June 25. She also went to the United Kingdom, making appearances on programmes such as This Morning, CD:UK and National Lottery. Spears visited the music variety show Hey! Hey! Hey! Music Champ in Japan, and performed at the Festival Bar in Italy. Spears was also featured on an episode of the ABC sitcom Sabrina, the Teenage Witch, in which she played herself. According to People, Spears was returning a favor to actress Melissa Joan Hart, who played a cameo role in Spears' music video for "(You Drive Me) Crazy". The episode aired on September 24. The same month, Spears performed on The Rosie O'Donnell Show on September 27, and visited Carson Daly on MTV's Total Request Live the following day. Spears also performed live with Joey McIntyre in the Disney Channel taped concert event titled Britney Spears & Joey McIntyre in Concert. In November, Spears performed "...Baby One More Time" and "(You Drive Me) Crazy" at the 1999 MTV Europe Music Awards. Promotion for the album continued in early 2000, when Spears performed at the 2000 American Music Awards, and also performed "From the Bottom of My Broken Heart" in a medley with "...Baby One More Time" at the 42nd Annual Grammy Awards.

On March 5, 1999, it was reported that Spears was planning her first headlining tour. She announced that the tour would start in July. On May 12, Tommy Hilfiger was announced as the main tour sponsor, as Spears was being featured in the company's "AllStars" campaign at the time. On December 17, during the premiere of the music video of "From the Bottom of My Broken Heart" on Total Request Live, Spears called the show to announce the March 2000 US tour dates. The extension, entitled (You Drive Me) Crazy Tour, was considered a prelude to her future world tour, Oops!... I Did It Again Tour. The leg's main sponsor was Got Milk?, whose media director Peter Gardiner explained: "Britney is magic with teen-age girls, and that's an absolutely crucial target for milk". Spears shot an advertising campaign to be shown before her performances began. The secondary sponsor was Polaroid, who released I-Zone as the tour's official camera. Spears used the I-Zone onstage to take pictures of the audience and further promote the product. The show was divided into segments, separated by interludes, and ended with an encore. The set list consisted of songs from ...Baby One More Time and several covers. Some changes were made during the 2000 leg, with the covers replaced by songs from her second studio album Oops!... I Did It Again (2000). The tour received positive critical reception. During the tour, Spears was accused of lip synching, although she denied those claims. On April 20, the concert at Hilton Hawaiian Village in Honolulu, Hawaii, was taped. It was slightly altered from its tour incarnation and featured different costumes. On June 5, it was broadcast on Fox, airing several times during the year. On November 21, Jive Records released the video album Britney Spears: Live and More!, which included the Fox special. It was certified triple platinum by the Recording Industry Association of America (RIAA) for shipping 300,000 units.

On August 14, 2017, 18 years after the release of ...Baby One More Time, it was announced that 2,500 pink-and-white-swirl copies of the album would be released on vinyl exclusively through Urban Outfitters on November 3. During the celebration of the 20th anniversary of Spears' debut single "...Baby One More Time", on October 19, 2018, Legacy Recordings announced the global release of the album on vinyl for November 23.

== Singles ==
The title track was released as the lead single from ...Baby One More Time and Spears' debut single on September 29, 1998. It received generally favorable critical reviews, which mostly praised its composition. After its accompanying music video premiered in late November, the single attained worldwide success in early 1999, peaking atop the US Billboard Hot 100 and in most countries it charted in. It received numerous certifications around the world, and is one of the best-selling singles of all time, selling over ten million copies. The music video, directed by Nigel Dick, portrays Spears as a high school student who starts to sing and dance around the school, while watching her love interest from afar. In 2010, the video was voted the third most influential video in the history of pop music on Jam!.

"Sometimes" was released as the second single from ...Baby One More Time on April 6, 1999. It achieved commercial success internationally, reaching number one in Belgium, the Netherlands and New Zealand. In the United States, however, it missed the top 20, peaking at number 21 on the Billboard Hot 100. The song's accompanying music video was directed by Nigel Dick. During rehearsals, on February 11, 1999, Spears injured her left knee and needed surgery. After recuperating in Kentwood, Louisiana, the video was filmed on April 9–10 at Paradise Cove in Malibu, California. It premiered on MTV's Total Request Live on May 6.

In May 1999, Max Martin and Spears went to the Battery Studios in New York City to re-record the vocals of "(You Drive Me) Crazy", for a reproduced version subtitled "The Stop! Remix", which was going to be included on the original motion picture soundtrack for the film Drive Me Crazy (1999). The remix was subsequently released as the third single from ...Baby One More Time on August 24. It features the addition of a stanza in which Spears yells "Stop!", then all sound cutting out, followed by a transition, while omitting the lines "Lovin' you means so much more, more than anything I ever felt before". The video was directed by Nigel Dick, and featured actors Melissa Joan Hart and Adrian Grenier.

"Born to Make You Happy" was released as the fourth and final European single from ...Baby One More Time on December 6, 1999, to a mixed critical reception. A commercial success, it peaked within the top five in 11 countries and atop the UK Singles Chart. Its accompanying music video was directed by Bille Woodruff, and choreographed by Wade Robson. Despite its success in Europe, the song was never released as a single in the US.

"From the Bottom of My Broken Heart" was released as the fourth and final North American and Oceanian single from ...Baby One More Time on December 14, 1999. The song received mixed critical reviews, which branded it a classic hit and competent single, despite considering it an unremarkable song referring only to kissing. It achieved moderate commercial success, peaking at number 14 on the US Billboard Hot 100. In Oceania, it peaked at number 37 in Australia and number 23 in New Zealand. It was certified platinum by the Recording Industry Association of America (RIAA) on March 28, 2000. The song's accompanying music video, directed by Gregory Dark, was released on December 17, 1999. It elicited controversy due to the fact that Dark had previously directed pornographic films.

== Critical reception ==
Professional ratings
Review scores
Source	Rating
AllMusic	4/5 stars
Christgau's Consumer Guide	(1-star Honorable Mention)
Entertainment Weekly	B+
NME	1/10
Q	2/5 stars
Rolling Stone	2/5 stars
Sonic.net	3/5 stars
Sputnikmusic	2/5
Tom Hull – on the Web	B+

...Baby One More Time received mixed reviews from music critics upon its release. The editors of AllMusic gave the album four out of five stars. Paul Verna from Billboard considered the album "a top 40-ready workout filled with hook-laden songs from the same bag as the title cut". The Village Voice critic Robert Christgau highlighted the title track and "Soda Pop" while summing the album up as a "girl next door" version of Madonna. Kyle Anderson of MTV said he "was surprised in more ways than one" with his first listening of ...Baby One More Time, commenting he "expected there to be a lot of filler (there sort of is), though I didn't expect it to be as odd (at least sonically) as it ended up being. There has never been any mystery to why Spears became such a superstar, but these songs probably would have been huge even if Britney wore burlap sacks in all of her videos."

Barry Walters of Rolling Stone gave the album two stars out of five, and compared the album's sound to early hits of Debbie Gibson, Mariah Carey and Samantha Fox. Walters also said that "while several Cherion-crafted kiddie-funk jams serve up beefy hooks, shameless schlock slowies, like 'E-Mail My Heart', is pure spam." An NME reviewer rated ...Baby One More Time one out of ten, saying that "we seem to have reached crisis point: pubescent pop is now so rife that 17-year-old Britney 'lizard-lounge' Spears is already halfway through her lucrative showbiz career". He also found the album premature, commenting: "hopefully, if she starts to live the wretched life that we all eventually do, her voice will show the scars, she'll stop looking so fucking smug, she'll find solace in drugs and we'll be all the happier for it. Now grow up, girl. Quick!" Amanda Murray of Sputnikmusic felt that "with the exception of the terrific title track, ...Baby One More Time is a collection of either competent pop songs underwhelmingly executed or underwhelmingly written pop songs competently executed."

In 2024, Paste listed the album among its picks for "The 300 Greatest Albums of All Time", with critic Olivia Abercrombie praising the album's iconic status and influence in pop music.

== Accolades ==
Awards and nominations
Year	Award	Category	Nominee(s)	Result	Ref.
1999	Juno Award	Best Selling Album (Foreign or Domestic)	...Baby One More Time	Nominated	
1999	Teen Choice Award	Choice Music – Album	...Baby One More Time	Won	
1999	YoungStar Award	Best Young Recording Artist or Musical Group	Britney Spears	Won	
1999	Billboard Music Award	Female Albums Artist of the Year	Britney Spears	Won	
2000	Guinness World Record	Best Selling Album in the US by a Female Artist	...Baby One More Time	Won	
2000	American Music Award	Favorite Pop/Rock Album	...Baby One More Time	Nominated	
2000	Blockbuster Entertainment Award	Favorite CD	...Baby One More Time	Nominated	
2000	Hungarian Music Award	Foreign Pop Album of the Year	...Baby One More Time	Nominated	
2003	Guinness World Record	Best Selling Album by a Teenage Solo Artist	...Baby One More Time	Won	

== Commercial performance ==
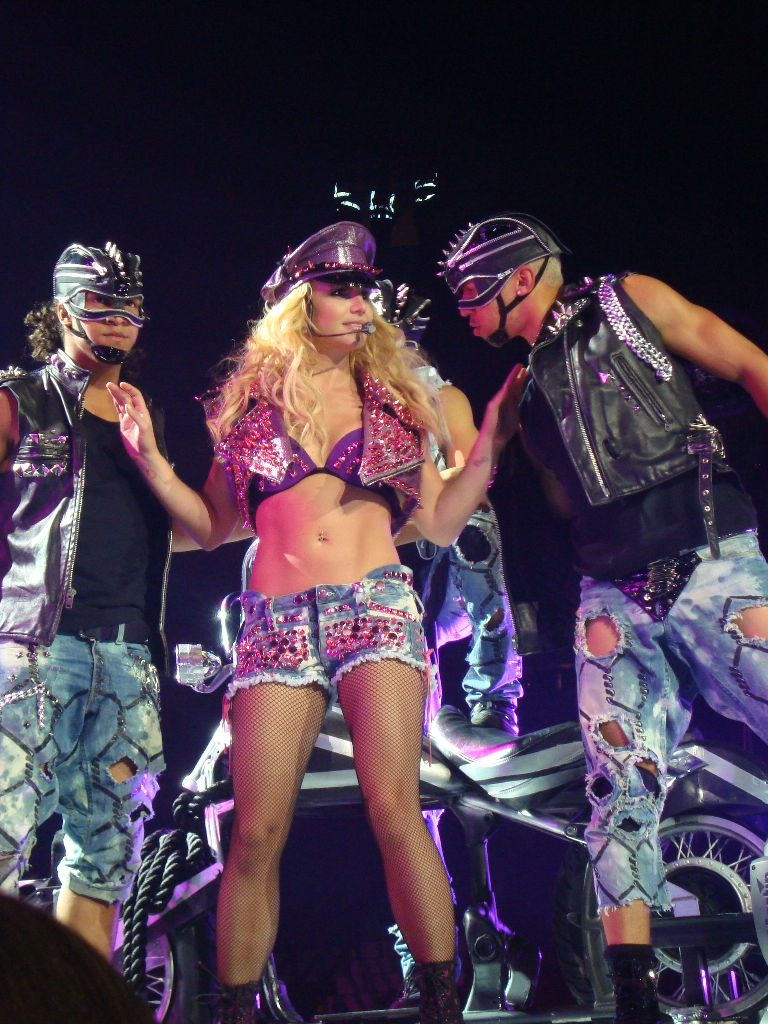
Spears and some of her dancers performing lead single "...Baby One More Time" during her 2011 Femme Fatale Tour

In the United States, ...Baby One More Time debuted atop the Billboard 200 with sales of 121,000 copies in its first week, beating DMX's Flesh of My Flesh, Blood of My Blood. Spears broke several records by doing so. The singer became the first new female artist to have a number-one single on the Billboard Hot 100 and number one album on the Billboard 200 at the same time; the first new artist (male or female) to have a single go to the number one spot the same week that the album debuted at number one; and the first new female artist to have the first single and first album at number one the same week. Spears is also the youngest female artist in Billboard history to have a simultaneous single and album at number one in the same week, and became the fifth artist under the age of 18 to top the Billboard 200.

After fluctuating within the top five, the album went back to the summit in its fourth week. It sold over 500,000 copies within its first month, according to Nielsen SoundScan. Its fifth week became the album's highest-selling week with 229,000 copies sold, bringing the total to 804,000 copies. ...Baby One More Time spent a total of six non-consecutive weeks at number one, and sold over 1.8 million copies in the US within its first two months. In its 47th week on the Billboard 200, the album held strong at number three, reaching the ten-million sales mark in the country. The album was certified diamond by the Recording Industry Association of America (RIAA) on December 9, 1999, making then-18-year-old Spears the youngest artist to receive that certification, breaking the record held by Alanis Morissette, who was 21 when her album Jagged Little Pill (1995) was certified diamond. It became the 14th album since 1991 to sell over ten million copies in the US, and Spears became the best-selling female artist of 1999. ...Baby One More Time spent a total of 51 weeks within the top ten on the Billboard 200. It was the second best-selling album of 1999 in the US, only behind Millennium by the Backstreet Boys. The album has spent a total of 103 weeks on the Billboard 200. ...Baby One More Time landed at number three on BMG Music Club's all-time best-sellers list, selling 1.6 million units through the club. As of May 2020, it has sold 10.7 million copies in the US according to Nielsen SoundScan, with the BMG Music Club sales bringing its total to 12.3 million units.

...Baby One More Time debuted atop the Canadian Albums Chart, spending nine non-consecutive weeks at the summit. On December 12, 1999, the Canadian Recording Industry Association (CRIA) certified it diamond, for sales of over one million units. The album spent two weeks at number two on the European Top 100 Albums, and sold over four million copies across Europe, being certified quadruple platinum by the International Federation of the Phonographic Industry (IFPI). It peaked at number two on the UK Albums Chart, and has been certified quadruple platinum by the British Phonographic Industry (BPI). It peaked at number four in France, being certified double platinum by the Syndicat National de l'Édition Phonographique (SNEP). In addition, it has been certified triple gold in Germany, and platinum by the Polish Society of the Phonographic Industry (ZPAV). In Australia, it debuted at number nine on the ARIA Albums Chart, reaching number two nine weeks later. The album became the seventh highest-selling album of 1999 in the country, and was certified quadruple platinum by the Australian Recording Industry Association (ARIA) the following year after shipping 280,000 copies to retailers. The album debuted at number three in New Zealand, later being certified triple platinum by the Recording Industry Association of New Zealand (RIANZ).

== Legacy ==
Although she was not the first pop singer to achieve success among teenagers in the late 1990s, Spears became the most successful, leading a group of artists that included Christina Aguilera, Jessica Simpson, and Mandy Moore. All of these performers had been developing material since 1998. RCA Records which had signed Christina Aguilera in early 1998, did not release her debut single and album ("Genie in a Bottle" in May 1999 and Aguilera's eponymous debut studio album in August) until after the release of "...Baby One More Time". Aguilera's album sold millions but not as many as ...Baby One More Time. Simpson consciously modeled her persona as more mature than Spears; her single "I Wanna Love You Forever" charted in September 1999, and her album Sweet Kisses followed shortly after. Moore's first single, "Candy", hit the airwaves a month before Simpson's single, but it did not perform as well on the charts; Moore was often seen as less accomplished than Spears and the others, coming in fourth of the "pop princesses". Fueling media stories about their competition for first place, Spears and Aguilera traded barbs but also compliments through the 2000s.

"With ...Baby One More Time, I didn't get to show my voice off. The songs were great, but they weren't very challenging."

— Spears reflects on ...Baby One More Time in December 1999.

The Daily Yomiuri reported that "critics have hailed her as the most gifted teenage pop idol for many years, but Spears has set her sights a little higher-she is aiming for the level of superstardom that has been achieved by Madonna and Janet Jackson." Rolling Stone wrote: "Britney Spears carries on the classic archetype of the rock & roll teen queen, the dungaree doll, the angel baby who just has to make a scene." Rami Yacoub who co-produced Spears's debut album with lyricist Max Martin commented: "I know from Denniz Pop and Max's previous productions, when we do songs, there's kind of a nasal thing. With N' Sync and the Backstreet Boys, we had to push for that mid-nasal voice. When Britney did that, she got this kind of raspy, sexy voice." Chuck Taylor of Billboard observed, "Spears has become a consummate performer, with snappy dance moves, a clearly real-albeit young-and funkdified voice ... "(You Drive Me) Crazy", her third single ... demonstrates Spears' own development, proving that the 17-year-old is finding her own vocal personality after so many months of steadfast practice." Stephen Thomas Erlewine of AllMusic referred to her music as a "blend of infectious, rap-inflected dance-pop and smooth balladry". Sputnikmusic writer Amanda Murray noted the album "offers a marker for Spears' progression as an artist, as a celebrity, and as a woman." In 2010, the album was included in the book 1001 Albums You Must Hear Before You Die.

Spears became an international pop culture icon immediately after launching her recording career. Rolling Stone wrote: "One of the most controversial and successful female vocalists of the 21st century," she "spearheaded the rise of post-millennial teen pop ... Spears early on cultivated a mixture of innocence and experience that generated lots of cash". She is listed by the Guinness World Records as having the "Best-selling album by a teenage solo artist". Melissa Ruggieri of the Richmond Times-Dispatch reported, "She's also marked for being the best-selling teenage artist. Before she turned 20 in 2001, Spears sold more than 25 million albums worldwide". Barbara Ellen of The Observer reported: "Spears is famously one of the 'oldest' teenagers pop has ever produced, almost middle aged in terms of focus and determination. Many 19-year-olds haven't even started working by that age, whereas Britney, a former Mouseketeer, was that most unusual and volatile of American phenomena — a child with a full-time career. While other little girls were putting posters on their walls, Britney was wanting to be the poster on the wall. Whereas other children develop at their own pace, Britney was developing at a pace set by the ferociously competitive American entertainment industry". ...Baby One More Time is Spears' most commercially successful album to date, with worldwide sales of 25 million copies. It was ranked at number 41 on the all-time US Billboard 200 chart, and at number 16 on the Billboard 200 albums by women.

== Track listing ==
...Baby One More Time track listing
No.	Title	Writer(s)	Producer(s)	Length
1.	"...Baby One More Time"	Max Martin	Martin; Rami Yacoub	3:30
2.	"(You Drive Me) Crazy"	Jörgen Elofsson; Per Magnusson; David Kreuger; Martin	Magnusson; Kreuger; Martin	3:17
3.	"Sometimes"	Elofsson	Magnusson; Kreuger; Elofsson^{[a]}	4:05
4.	"Soda Pop"	Mikey Bassie; Eric Foster White	White	3:20
5.	"Born to Make You Happy"	Kristian Lundin; Andreas Carlsson	Lundin	4:03
6.	"From the Bottom of My Broken Heart"	White	White	5:11
7.	"I Will Be There"	Martin; Carlsson	Martin; Yacoub	3:53
8.	"I Will Still Love You" (duet with Don Philip)	White	White	4:02
9.	"Thinkin' About You"	Bassie; White	White	3:35
10.	"E-Mail My Heart"	White	White	3:41
11.	"The Beat Goes On"	Sonny Bono; White	White; The All Seeing I^{[b]}	3:43
Total length:				42:20

Deluxe edition bonus tracks
No.	Title	Writer(s)	Producer(s)	Length
9.	"Deep in My Heart"	Magnusson; Kreuger; Carlsson	Magnusson; Kreuger	3:36
13.	"I'll Never Stop Loving You"	Blume; Diamond	Magnusson; Kreuger	3:43
14.	"Autumn Goodbye"	White	White	3:42
15.	"...Baby One More Time" (Davidson Ospina Radio Mix)	Martin	Martin; Rami; Ospina^{[b]}	3:26
16.	"...Baby One More Time" (Boy Wunder Radio Mix)	Martin	Martin; Rami; Boy Wunder^{[b]}	3:27
Total length:				60:20

South Korean limited edition bonus disc
No.	Title	Writer(s)	Producer(s)	Length
1.	"(You Drive Me) Crazy" (The Stop! Remix)	Elofsson; Magnusson; Kreuger; Martin	Martin; Rami	3:16
2.	"(You Drive Me) Crazy" (Spacedust Club Mix)	Elofsson; Magnusson; Kreuger; Martin	Martin; Rami; Spacedust^{[b]}	7:20
3.	"Sometimes" (Soul Solution – Mid Tempo Mix)	Elofsson	Magnusson; Kreuger; Elofsson^{[a]}; Soul Solution^{[b]}	3:29
4.	"...Baby One More Time" (Davidson Ospina Club Mix)	Martin	Martin; Rami; Ospina^{[b]}	5:40
5.	"I'll Never Stop Loving You"	Blume; Diamond	Magnusson; Kreuger	3:41
6.	"I'm So Curious"	Britney Spears; White	White	3:35
Total length:				27:01

=== Notes ===
- ^{^[a]} signifies a co-producer
- ^{^[b]} signifies an additional producer
- Initial CD pressings feature a hidden spoken message after "The Beat Goes On". In the message, Spears thanks her fans and promotes Backstreet Boys' then-upcoming album Millennium, with snippets of songs featured on the album.
- Track 9 originally appeared on international pressings, excluding vinyl pressings and South Korean editions.
- Tracks 13 and 15 originally appeared on Asian pressings.
- Japanese standard edition pressings use the same track listing as the deluxe edition.
- Taiwanese limited edition pressings include a bonus video CD containing an interview and behind-the-scenes footage.
- Singaporean limited edition pressings include a bonus disc containing the radio edit and bonus remix of "Born to Make You Happy", the Jazzy Jim's Hip-Hop Mix of "(You Drive Me) Crazy" and an answering machine message of "...Baby One More Time".

== Personnel ==
Credits are adapted from the liner notes of ...Baby One More Time, except where noted.

- Mikey Bassie – vocals (track 4)
- Daniel Boom – engineering
- Jimmy Bralower – drum programming
- Jason Buckler – production
- Larry Busacca – photography
- Andreas Carlsson – backing vocals
- Tom Coyne – mastering
- Denniz Pop – production (uncredited)
- Nikki Gregoroff – backing vocals
- Nana Hedin – backing vocals
- Andy Hess – bass
- Dean Honer – production
- David Kreuger – production
- Tim Latham – engineering, mixing
- Tomas Lindberg – bass
- Kristian Lundin – production
- Per Magnusson – keyboards, production, programming
- Max Martin – backing vocals, engineering, keyboards, mixing, production, programming
- Charles McCrorey – engineering assistance
- Andrew McIntyre – electric guitar
- Jackie Murphy – art direction, design
- Lisa Peardon – photography
- Dan Petty – acoustic guitar, electric guitar
- Doug Petty – keyboards
- Don Philip – vocals (track 8)
- Rami – production
- Albert Sanchez – photography
- Aleese Simmons – backing vocals
- Britney Spears – vocals
- Chris Trevett – engineering, mixing
- Eric Foster White – arrangement, bass, drum programming, electric guitar, engineering, keyboards, mixing, production
- Timothy White – photography

== Charts ==
=== Weekly charts ===
1999–2000 weekly chart performance
Chart (1999–2000)	Peak position
Argentine Albums (CAPIF)	8
Australian Albums (ARIA)	2
Australian Dance Albums (ARIA)	1
Austrian Albums (Ö3 Austria)	2
Belgian Albums (Ultratop Flanders)	2
Belgian Albums (Ultratop Wallonia)	2
Canadian Albums (Billboard)	1
Canadian Top Albums/CDs (RPM)	1
Czech Albums (ČNS IFPI)	5
Danish Albums (Hitlisten)	7
Dutch Albums (Album Top 100)	3
Estonian Albums (Eesti Top 10)	1
European Top 100 Albums (Music & Media)	2
Finnish Albums (Suomen virallinen lista)	11
French Albums (SNEP)	4
German Albums (Offizielle Top 100)	1
Greek Albums (IFPI)	5
Hungarian Albums (MAHASZ)	4
Icelandic Albums (Tónlistinn)	4
Irish Albums (IRMA)	6
Italian Albums (FIMI)	8
Japanese Albums (Oricon)	9
Malaysian Albums (RIM)	3
Mexican Albums (AMPROFON)	1
New Zealand Albums (RMNZ)	3
Norwegian Albums (VG-lista)	5
Portuguese Albums (AFP)	1
Scottish Albums (Official Charts)	6
Singaporean Albums (SPVA)	9
Spanish Albums (AFYVE)	2
Swedish Albums (Sverigetopplistan)	10
Swiss Albums (Schweizer Hitparade)	1
Taiwanese International Albums (IFPI Taiwan)	1
UK Albums (Official Charts)	2
UK Independent Albums (Official Charts)	2
US Billboard 200	1

2012 weekly chart performance for the deluxe edition
Chart (2012)	Peak position
South Korean International Albums (Gaon)	23

2020–2023 weekly chart performance
Chart (2020–2023)	Peak position
Spanish Albums (PROMUSICAE)	81
US Vinyl Albums (Billboard)	12

=== Monthly charts ===
Monthly chart performance
Chart (1999)	Peak position
South Korean International Albums (RIAK)	13

=== Seasonal charts ===
1999 seasonal chart performance
Chart (1999)	Position
Norwegian Russetid Albums (VG-lista)	11
Norwegian Spring Albums (VG-lista)	19

=== Year-end charts ===
1999 year-end chart performance
Chart (1999)	Position
Australian Albums (ARIA)	7
Austrian Albums (Ö3 Austria)	4
Belgian Albums (Ultratop Flanders)	3
Belgian Albums (Ultratop Wallonia)	4
Canadian Top Albums/CDs (RPM)	2
Danish Albums (Hitlisten)	27
Dutch Albums (Album Top 100)	11
European Top 100 Albums (Music & Media)	5
French Albums (SNEP)	21
German Albums (Offizielle Top 100)	8
Japanese Albums (Oricon)	85
New Zealand Albums (RMNZ)	15
Swiss Albums (Schweizer Hitparade)	11
UK Albums (OCC)	14
US Billboard 200	2

2000 year-end chart performance
Chart (2000)	Position
Australian Albums (ARIA)	94
Belgian Albums (Ultratop Flanders)	34
Belgian Albums (Ultratop Wallonia)	42
Canadian Albums (Nielsen SoundScan)	71
Dutch Albums (Album Top 100)	64
European Top 100 Albums (Music & Media)	22
French Albums (SNEP)	45
German Albums (Offizielle Top 100)	61
Swiss Albums (Schweizer Hitparade)	27
UK Albums (OCC)	36
US Billboard 200	17

=== Decade-end charts ===
1990s decade-end chart performance
Chart (1990–1999)	Position
US Billboard 200	29

2000s decade-end chart performance
Chart (2000–2009)	Position
US Billboard 200	81

=== All-time charts ===
All-time chart performance
Chart	Position
US Billboard 200	41
US Billboard 200 (Women)	16

== Certifications and sales ==
Certifications and sales
Region	Certification	Certified units/sales
Argentina (CAPIF)	4× Platinum	240,000^{^}
Australia (ARIA)	4× Platinum	280,000^{^}
Austria (IFPI Austria)	Platinum	50,000^{*}
Belgium (BRMA)	3× Platinum	150,000^{*}
Brazil (Pro-Música Brasil)	Gold	250,000
Canada (Music Canada)	Diamond	1,000,000^{^}
Denmark (IFPI Danmark)	3× Platinum	60,000^{‡}
Finland (Musiikkituottajat)	Gold	37,865
France (SNEP)	2× Platinum	625,000
Germany (BVMI)	3× Gold	750,000^{^}
Iceland	—	5,000
Italy	—	200,000
Japan (RIAJ)	Platinum	279,740
Mexico (AMPROFON)	2× Platinum+Gold	500,000
Netherlands (NVPI)	3× Platinum	300,000^{^}
New Zealand (RMNZ)	3× Platinum	45,000^{^}
Norway (IFPI Norway)	Platinum	50,000^{*}
Philippines (PARI)	4× Platinum	200,000
Poland (ZPAV)	Platinum	100,000^{*}
Singapore (SPVA)	Platinum	15,000
South Korea	—	48,058
Spain (Promusicae)	3× Platinum	300,000^{^}
Sweden (GLF)	Platinum	80,000^{^}
Switzerland (IFPI Switzerland)	2× Platinum	100,000^{^}
United Kingdom (BPI)	4× Platinum	1,210,000
United States (RIAA)	14× Platinum	12,300,000 (Note: According to Nielsen SoundScan, ...Baby One More Time has sold 10,700,000 copies in the US as of 2020. Nielsen SoundScan did not count sales via music clubs such as BMG Music Service, through which the album had sold 1,300,000 additional units by 2003, bringing its sales total to 12,300,000 units.)
Summaries
Asia	—	1,680,000
Europe (IFPI)	4× Platinum	4,000,000^{*}
Worldwide	—	25,000,000
^{*} Sales figures based on certification alone.^{^} Shipments figures based on certification alone.^{‡} Sales+streaming figures based on certification alone.

== Release history ==
Release dates and formats
Region	Date	Edition(s)	Format(s)	Label(s)	Ref.
United States	January 12, 1999	Standard	Cassette; CD	Jive	
Japan	February 24, 1999	Standard	CD	Avex Trax	
Australia	March 8, 1999	Standard	CD	Zomba	
Germany	March 8, 1999	Standard	CD	Rough Trade	
United Kingdom	March 8, 1999	Standard	Cassette; CD	Jive	
Argentina	March 17, 1999	Standard	CD	EMI	
South Korea	March 25, 1999	Standard	Cassette; CD	Zomba	
France	March 29, 1999	Standard	CD	Virgin	
Australia	November 23, 1999	Deluxe	CD	Zomba	
Germany	June 30, 2003	Deluxe	CD	Jive	
France	October 14, 2003	Deluxe	CD	Jive	
United States	December 25, 2007	Deluxe	Digital download	Jive	
Various	November 23, 2018	Standard	Vinyl (Note: Prior to the 2018 picture disc release, ...Baby One More Time was made available on limited-edition vinyl exclusively at Urban Outfitters in November 2017. The album was globally reissued on vinyl on March 31, 2023.)	Legacy	

== See also ==
- Britney Spears discography
- List of Billboard 200 number-one albums of 1999
- List of number-one albums of 1999 (Canada)
- List of number-one hits of 1999 (Germany)
- List of number-one albums of 1999 (Portugal)
- List of best-selling albums
- List of best-selling albums by women
- List of best-selling albums in the Philippines
- List of best-selling albums in the United States
