= Oops!... I Did It Again (album) =

2000 Britney Spears album

Studio album by Britney Spears
- Released: May 3, 2000
- Recorded: September 20, 1999 – February 26, 2000
- Studios: 3rd Floor (New York City); Avatar (New York City); Battery (New York City); Cheiron (Stockholm); Electric Lady (New York City); East Bay (Tarrytown); Pacifique (Los Angeles); Rarc (Orlando); Unnamed location (La Tour-de-Peilz)
- Genres: Pop; dance-pop; teen pop
- Length: 44:26
- Label: Jive
- Producers: Barry J. Eastmond; David Kreuger; Eric Foster White; Jake; Kristian Lundin; Max Martin; Larry "Rock" Campbell; Paul Umbach; Per Magnusson; Rami; Robert "Esmail" Jazayeri; Robert John "Mutt" Lange; Darkchild; Steve Lunt; Timmy Allen

Britney Spears chronology
| ...Baby One More Time (1999) | Oops!... I Did It Again (2000) | Britney (2001) |

Singles from Oops!... I Did It Again
- 1. "Oops!... I Did It Again" Released: April 11, 2000; 2. "Lucky" Released: July 25, 2000; 3. "Stronger" Released: October 31, 2000; 4. "Don't Let Me Be the Last to Know" Released: March 12, 2001

Oops!... I Did It Again is the second studio album by American singer Britney Spears. It was released on May 3, 2000, by Jive Records. Following the enormous commercial success of her debut studio album ...Baby One More Time (1999) and the completion of its accompanying concert tour of the same title, Spears began recording material for her second studio album in September 1999. Pressured to duplicate the success of ...Baby One More Time, she collaborated with a wide range of producers, including Max Martin, Rami Yacoub, Per Magnusson, David Kreuger, Kristian Lundin, Jake Schulze, Darkchild, and Robert John "Mutt" Lange for Oops!... I Did It Again. The final result was a pop, dance-pop and teen pop record exceedingly in the vein of ...Baby One More Time, but incorporating funk and R&B. The production, sonic quality, and Spears's vocal performance received critical acclaim upon the album's release.

Oops!... I Did It Again was a massive commercial success worldwide, debuting at number one in over 20 countries. In the United States, the album debuted at number one on the Billboard 200, with first-week sales of 1.319 million copies, holding the record for the fastest-selling album by a female artist and the largest first-week sales for a female album for 15 years, until being surpassed by Adele's 25 (2015), which sold over 3.38 million copies in its first week. In addition, Oops!... I Did It Again received a nomination for Best Pop Vocal Album at the 43rd Annual Grammy Awards (2001). It became Spears's second consecutive album to be certified diamond by the Recording Industry Association of America (RIAA), making Spears the youngest artist to have multiple diamond albums. With worldwide sales of over 20 million copies, it is one of the best-selling albums of all time.

Oops!... I Did It Again produced four singles. The title track was a global commercial success, reaching number one in 17 countries and peaking at number nine on the US Billboard Hot 100. "Lucky" peaked within the top ten in 16 countries, but only at number 23 on the US Billboard Hot 100. "Stronger" peaked at number 11 on the US Billboard Hot 100. The final single "Don't Let Me Be the Last to Know" was moderately successful across Europe but did not chart in the United States. To promote the album, Spears performed on several television shows and award ceremonies, including a controversial performance at the 2000 MTV Video Music Awards, also hosting and performing for the first time on Saturday Night Live. Furthermore, she embarked on her third concert tour, entitled the Oops!... I Did It Again Tour (2000). On May 16, 2025, the 25th anniversary edition of the album was released.

== Recording and production ==
"When I did the first album, I had just turned 16. I mean, when I look at the album cover, I'm like, 'Oh, my lordy.' I know this next album's going to be totally different–especially the material. I just got finished recording the first six tracks in Sweden two months ago, and the material is so much more funkier and edgier. And, of course, it's more mature because I've grown as a person too."

— Spears on the progression of her recording for Oops!... I Did It Again

After vacationing for six days following the completion of the ...Baby One More Time Tour in September 1999, Spears returned to New York City on September 20 to begin recording songs for her second studio album. Producers Max Martin, Eric Foster White, Diane Warren, Robert Lange, Steve Lunt, and Babyface made contributions to the album. "Where Are You Now" and bonus track "You Got It All"–a cover of the Jets' 1986 song of the same title–were outtakes from the recording sessions for ...Baby One More Time. The songs "Oops!... I Did It Again", "Walk on By", (Note: "Walk on By" did not make the final cut for Oops!... I Did It Again, but was released as a B-side to its third single "Stronger". English singer Gareth Gates would later record a cover version of the song for his debut studio album What My Heart Wants to Say (2002).) "What U See (Is What U Get)", and "Don't Go Knockin' on My Door" were recorded at Martin's Cheiron Studios within the first week of November. Spears recorded "Don't Let Me Be the Last to Know" at Lange's villa in Switzerland in December 1999; Lange produced the song. "Stronger" and "Lucky" soon followed, and were finalized along with the title track in January 2000.

By January, the then-untitled Oops!... I Did It Again was halfway to completion. Instrumental tracks and melodies of "Girl in the Mirror" and "Can't Make You Love Me" had been recorded in the fall of 1999 in Sweden, with Spears recording the vocals on January 14 at the Parc Studios in Orlando, Florida. After recording internationally, Spears returned to New York City, linking up with producer Steve Lunt to record Diane Warren's "When Your Eyes Say It" at the Battery Studios on January 28, which preceded her Total Request Live appearance that day. "One Kiss from You" was also recorded at the Battery Studios, later being finished at 3rd Floor in New York City. Spears also demoed and recorded "Dear Diary", which would later be completed at East Bay Recording in Tarrytown, New York and at the Avatar Studios in New York City. Spears' cover of "(I Can't Get No) Satisfaction" was recorded with Rodney Jerkins at the Pacifique Recording Studios in Los Angeles during February 24–26, 2000, after the 42nd Annual Grammy Awards.

Spears was heavily pressured to repeat the tremendous commercial success of ...Baby One More Time, stating: "It's kind of hard following ten million, I have to say. But after listening to the new material and recording it, I'm really confident with it." Upon the album's release, Spears said: "I mean, of course there's some pressure", and added: "But in my opinion, [Oops!] is a lot better than the first album. It's edgier – it has more of an attitude. It's more me, and I think teenagers will relate to it more." Geoff Mayfield, director of the Billboard charts, added that the decision to release Oops!... I Did It Again less than a year and a half after Spears' debut amounts to "very smart timing. My philosophy is when you have a young fan base, get 'em while they're hot."

== Music and lyrics ==
Oops!... I Did It Again was considered the sequel to ...Baby One More Time, percolating with a carefully measured blend of pop, funk, R&B and power balladry. Spears said in an interview that the album showcased a more mature, R&B-flavored pop sound. "It's not something I changed purposefully", Spears said of the album's sound and added: "It's just something that kind of changed on itself with me being older. My voice has changed a little bit and I'm more confident, and I think that comes across on the material." Rodney "Darkchild" Jerkins talked about working with Spears on the cover of the Rolling Stones' "(I Can't Get No) Satisfaction", stating: "It's going to shock everybody. It has flavors of the original, but it's a straight 2000 version — new to the ear. Which I think is cool, because people who appreciate that song are going to love it. And I made it so new and young that the young kids that love Britney are going to love it. It's going to grab both a mature and young audience." Spears worked with Robert "Mutt" Lange on "Don't Let Me Be the Last to Know", telling MTV News: "When you hear the song, it's so pure and delicate. It's just one of those songs that pull you in", and added: "I think they wrote it 'specially for me, because the lyrics of the song, if you really listen … they're more of what I can relate to, 'cause they're kind of young lyrics, I think. I don't think Shania would probably sing some of the words that I'm saying."

Oops!... I Did It Again opens with its title track, which was compared to her debut single, "...Baby One More Time" (1998), featuring a slap-and-pop bassline, synthesizer chord stabs and a mechanized beat. Lyrically, the song sees Spears warning to an overeager prospective lover: "Oops, you think I'm in love / That I'm sent from above / I'm not that innocent." The song also breaks down for a spoken-word interlude, involving a line referencing the film Titanic (1997). The second track "Stronger" is a synthpop and R&B-infused track, which is lyrically a declaration of independence, seeing Spears leaving a partner who treats her as property. The line "my loneliness ain't killing me no more" makes reference to the verse "my loneliness is killing me" from her debut single "...Baby One More Time". Another R&B-infused track which also incorporates funk, "Don't Go Knocking on My Door" finds Spears confidently forging ahead after a breakup. "(I Can't Get No) Satisfaction" begins with mushy guitar plucking and breathy coos, until a dry, crackling lockstep is thrown down, turning the song into an urban stomp. The dance-pop cover also jettisons the song's final verse and adds new lyrics (i.e. "how white my shirts could be" becomes "how tight my skirt should be"). "[It] was my idea [to record the song]", Spears said, adding: "I was just like, 'I like this song,' and I think it will be a really cool combination working with [Jerkins] and doing a really funky song like that."

The fifth track "Don't Let Me Be the Last to Know" was co-written by country pop singer-songwriter Shania Twain and her then-husband Lange, who also produced the track. The ballad, which boasts a slinky keyboard riff and Lange's characteristically lavish production, finds Spears allowing a bit of "country twang" into her vocals as she begs a lover to reveal his feelings: "My friends say you're into me ... but I need to hear it straight from you". "What U See (Is What U Get)" demands respect by rebuking a jealous partner, while "Lucky" is a heart-rending tale of a Hollywood starlet's loneliness, proving that fame can be empty: "If there's nothing missing in my life/Then why do these tears come at night?". "School crush" is the lyrical theme of "One Kiss from You", a track with a reggae-style beat and lyrics about the feelings of falling in love and the quickness of it, with Spears cooing that after only one kiss she sees her entire future with her lover. The ballad "Where Are You Now" talks about wanting to know where a former lover is and what they have been up to, so that the protagonist can finally let them go and find closure. Lines on the Europop track "Can't Make You Love Me" state that fancy cars and money pale in comparison to true love, with Spears singing: "I'm just a girl with a crush on you." The mid-tempo, synth-backed "When Your Eyes Say It", written by songwriter Diane Warren, combines a string section with a loping hip hop beat, while Spears makes her own songwriting debut on the modest, keyboard-driven ballad "Dear Diary", which she said was autobiographical. On the track, she sings about wanting to become "so much more than friends" with a boy.

== Release and promotion ==
In late 1999, Spears promoted then-upcoming Oops!... I Did It Again in Europe, appearing on Smash Hits in the United Kingdom. In Italy, she did a short interview on the television show TRL Italy in early 2000. In Australia, Spears appeared on Russell Gilbert Live and The House of Hits. In the United States, Spears embarked on her (You Drive Me) Crazy Tour on March 8; the tour ended with a free concert in Honolulu, Hawaii on April 24, which aired on Fox as a television special titled Britney Spears in Hawaii. In Japan, Spears had a press event at Kokusai Forum Hall in Tokyo on May 2, and Oops!... I Did It Again was released the following day. Spears gave a surprise performance in Paris on May 6. In the US, Spears was interviewed on Late Night with Conan O'Brien on May 10, hosted and performed on Saturday Night Live on May 13, and appeared on The Rosie O'Donnell Show on May 15. On May 14, she appeared at MTV's Times Square studios for two hours of "Britney Live", and held her post-Total Request Live listening party titled "Britney's First Listen" on May 16, the day Oops!... I Did It Again was released in the US. She also performed on The Tonight Show with Jay Leno on May 23, and appeared on Teen People's 25 Under 25 on May 26.

To further promote Oops!... I Did It Again, Spears embarked on the Oops!... I Did It Again Tour. It was scheduled to begin on June 15 but started five days later, visiting North America during the summer and Europe during the fall, hence becoming Spears's first European tour. On June 24, Spears was featured in a print and television advertising campaign for Clairol's Herbal Essences shampoo line. In a special coup for Clairol, Spears recorded her own song for the brand, titled "I've Got the Urge to Herbal", which was featured in 60-second radio spots and was part of a pre-concert video presentation for the tour, which Herbal Essences sponsored. During the tour, Spears continued with televised appearances and performances to promote the album. She performed "Oops!... I Did It Again" and "Lucky" on MTV's All Access: Backstage with Britney, which aired on July 19. On September 7, at the 2000 MTV Video Music Awards in New York City at the Radio City Music Hall, Spears gave a memorable live performance, which included a cover of the Rolling Stones's hit single "(I Can't Get No) Satisfaction" (1965) and her own "Oops!... I Did It Again". While she began her segment in a black suit, she shocked the audience and the media by ripping it off to display a revealing, skin-colored stage outfit with hundreds of strategically placed Swarovski crystals. In Spain, she was interviewed on El Rayo, which aired on September 8. She performed "Stronger" at the Radio Music Awards on November 4, at the M6 Awards on November 17, and the American Music Awards of 2001 on January 8, 2001. She performed at Rock in Rio in Brazil on January 18, sharing the stage with headliners NSYNC.

=== Singles ===
According to Billboard, Oops!... I Did It Again is one of the 15 best-performing 21st-century albums without any of its singles reaching number one on the US Billboard Hot 100 as of 2022. Its only top-ten on the chart was its lead single "Oops!... I Did It Again, which reached number nine. In comparison to the huge success of her debut single "...Baby One More Time", Jive Records considered "Oops!... I Did It Again" a minor disappointment. The song peaked atop the US Mainstream Top 40, holding the record for the most radio additions in one day. "Oops!... I Did It Again" peaked atop the charts in Australia, Belgium, Canada, Italy, the Netherlands, New Zealand, Norway, Poland, Romania, Spain, Sweden, Switzerland and the United Kingdom. An accompanying music video for "Oops!... I Did It Again" saw Spears on Mars in a now-iconic red shiny catsuit, while she is visited by an American astronaut who hands her the fictional Heart of the Ocean jewel, which Rose threw into the sea at the end of Titanic (1997).

"Lucky" was released as the second single from Oops!... I Did It Again on July 25, 2000 to a positive response from the music critics, who considered it one of the album's best offerings. Commercially, "Lucky" topped the charts in Austria, Germany, Sweden and Switzerland, while reaching number five on the UK Singles Chart. In the United States, "Lucky" only managed to peak at number 23 on the Billboard Hot 100 and at number nine on the Mainstream Top 40. Its "glittery" accompanying music video sees Spears as both the narrator and an actress named Lucky, who is a melancholy movie star and shows her conflicted relationship to fame.

"Stronger" was released as the third single from Oops!... I Did It Again on October 31, 2000. It became the album's second highest-charting single in the US, peaking at number 11 on the Billboard Hot 100 and atop the Hot Singles Sales. It reached number seven on the UK Singles Chart. Its accompanying music video sees Spears catching her boyfriend cheating on her at a futuristic turntable nightclub, then driving off, getting in a wreck and singing in the rain, while the chair sequence in the video was inspired by Janet Jackson's music video for "The Pleasure Principle".

"Don't Let Me Be the Last to Know" was released as the fourth and final single from Oops!... I Did It Again on March 12, 2001. In the US, the song performed below expectations, failing to chart on any of the Billboard charts. However, the song attained success in Europe, peaking atop the Romanian Top 100 and within the top ten in Austria, Poland and Switzerland, while just missing the top ten in Germany, Ireland, Sweden and the United Kingdom, peaking at number 12 in all of them. The accompanying music video was considered too racy at the time, portraying Spears in love scenes with her fictional boyfriend, played by French model Brice Durand.

== Critical reception ==
Professional ratings
Aggregate scores
| Source | Rating |
|---|---|
| Metacritic | 72/100 |
Review scores
| Source | Rating |
| AllMusic | 4/5 stars |
| The Austin Chronicle | 2.5/5 stars |
| Christgau's Consumer Guide | (choice cut) |
| Entertainment Weekly | B |
| Dotmusic | 8/10 |
| Los Angeles Daily News | 1/4 stars |
| NME | 8/10 |
| Rolling Stone | 3.5/5 stars |
| Slant Magazine | 1/5 stars |
| Sonic | 3.5/5 stars |

Upon release, the album received mixed-to-positive reviews from critics. At Metacritic, which assigns a normalized rating out of 100 to reviews from mainstream critics, Oops!... I Did It Again received an average score of 72, based on 12 reviews, indicating "generally favorable reviews". Giving the album four out of five stars, Stephen Thomas Erlewine of AllMusic noted that the album "has the same combination of sweetly sentimental ballads and endearingly gaudy dance-pop that made 'One More Time'," but remarked that, "Fortunately, she and her production team not only have a stronger overall set of songs this time, but they also occasionally get carried away with the same bewildering magpie aesthetic, [...] giv[ing] the album character apart from the well-crafted dance-pop and ballads that serve as its heart. In the end, it's what makes this an entertaining, satisfying listen." Billboard magazine wrote that "'Oops!...' indicates that she's developing a soulful edge and emotional depth that can't be conjured with a glass-shattering note," praising the album for "consistently cast[ing] Spears as a young woman coming to terms with her inner power—and that's a darn good message to offer an impressionable audience." Entertainment Weekly's David Browne gave the album a B-rating, writing that the album "reminds us once again that the best new pop can be a blast of cool air in a stifling room."

Rob Sheffield of Rolling Stone gave the album a three-and-a-half out of five stars rating, calling the album "fantastic pop cheese, with much better song-factory hooks than NSYNC or BSB get", also noting that "the great thing about Oops!, under the cheese surface, is complex, fierce and downright scary, making her a true child of rock & roll tradition." A writer of NME reported that "she's modern-day pop perfection realised in a nearly, human form", commenting that "she's done it again." Lennat Mak of MTV Asia named it "a brilliant second album", writing that Spears "is armed with a more mature and seasoned pop star look, stronger and poppier songs, and of course, extensive media exposure." Andy Battaglia of Salon called the album "a masterpiece of sorts not for its message but for the way it applies the conventions of the pop-musical medium." Website The A.V. Club was more mixed, calling it "a joyless bit of redundant, obvious, competent cheese, recycling itself at every turn and soliciting songwriting from such soulless hacks as Diane Warren and assorted Swedes."

More negative reviews found a lack of depth in the album. The Los Angeles Daily News referred to the album as "transparently shallow" while Slant Magazine wrote that the album was "super-processed, disposable crap, and Spears doesn't even have the personality to salvage it".

== Accolades ==
Awards and nominations
| Year | Award | Category | Nominee(s) | Result | Ref. |
|---|---|---|---|---|---|
| 2000 | Artist Direct Awards | Favourite Turn-It-Up CD | Oops!... I Did It Again | Nominated | |
| 2000 | Billboard Music Award | Biggest One-Week Sales of an Album Ever by a Female Artist | Britney Spears | Won | |
| 2000 | Billboard Music Award | Albums Artist of the Year | Britney Spears | Won | |
| 2001 | American Music Award | Favorite Pop/Rock Album | Oops!... I Did It Again | Nominated | |
| 2001 | Grammy Award | Best Pop Vocal Album | Oops!... I Did It Again | Nominated | |
| 2001 | Juno Award | Best Selling Album (Foreign or Domestic) | Oops!... I Did It Again | Nominated | |
| 2001 | Guinness World Record | Fastest-selling album by a teenage solo artist | Oops!... I Did It Again | Won | |

== Commercial performance ==
In the United States, Oops!... I Did It Again reportedly sold 500,000 copies in its first day of release. It debuted at number one on the Billboard 200 chart, with first-week sales of 1,319,193 copies, becoming the fastest-selling album by a female artist since Nielsen SoundScan began tracking point-of-sale music purchases in 1991. With its success, Spears held the record for the highest first-week sales by a female artist. This record was held for 15 years, only to be surpassed in November 2015 by the album 25 by Adele, which sold over 3.38 million albums in the United States in its first week. The album fell to number two in its second week, with additional sales of 612,000 copies. It held this position for fifteen consecutive weeks. By its fifth week of availability, Oops!... I Did It Again had sold over three million copies and had passed five million copies by August. On its seventeenth week on the chart, it was certified septuple Platinum by the Recording Industry Association of America (RIAA) for shipments of seven million units. The album spent eighty-four weeks on the Billboard 200, thirty-one weeks on the Canadian Albums Chart, and two weeks on the US Catalog Albums. Oops!... I Did It Again debuted at number eighty-two on the European Top 100 Albums, and quickly peaked at number one; it sold over four million copies within the continent, being certified four-times Platinum by the International Federation of the Phonographic Industry. Oops!... I Did It Again reached number two on the UK Albums Chart, selling 88,145 copies in the first week of release; it spent three weeks in the top five and eight weeks in the top ten. The album debuted at number one in Canada, selling 95,275 copies in its first week.

It topped the French Albums Chart and the German Offizielle Top 100, also being certified triple Platinum by the British Phonographic Industry (BPI), double Gold by the Syndicat National de l'Édition Phonographique (SNEP) and triple Platinum by Bundesverband Musikindustrie (BVMI), denoting shipments to retailers of 900,000 units, 200,000 copies sold and 900,000 units shipped, respectively. In Australia, the album debuted at number two on the ARIA Albums Chart, and spent ten weeks in the top twenty; it became the fourteenth highest-selling of 2000 in the country and was certified double Platinum by the Australian Recording Industry Association (ARIA) the following year after shipping 140,000 copies to retailers. Oops!... I Did It Again opened at number three on the New Zealand Albums Chart and was certified Gold after seven weeks on the chart. The Recording Industry Association of New Zealand (RIANZ) ultimately certified it double Platinum. Oops!... I Did It Again became the third best-selling album of 2000 in the United States, selling 7,893,544 albums according to Nielsen SoundScan and fourth best-selling album according to Billboard Year-End of 2000. On January 24, 2005, the album was certified decuple Platinum (Diamond) by the Recording Industry Association of America (RIAA). Also, the album landed at number twenty-seven on BMG Music Club all-time best-sellers list with 1.21 million units, behind Shania Twain's The Woman in Me (1.24 million) and Nirvana's Nevermind (1.24 million). As of July 2009, the album has sold 9,184,000 copies in the United States, excluded copies sold through clubs, such as the BMG Music Service. Worldwide, Oops!... I Did It Again sold 2.5 million copies in its first week (second highest first week sales by a female artist worldwide) and sold 15 million copies by the end of the year. It was the best-selling female album and 3rd best selling album of 2000. The album has sold 20 million copies worldwide.

== Copyright lawsuit ==
Musicians Michael Cottril and Lawrence Wnukowski filed a copyright case against Spears, Zomba Recording Corporation, Jive Records, Wright Entertainment Group and BMG Music Publishing, claiming Spears' "What U See (Is What U Get)" and "Can't Make You Love Me" are "virtually identical" to one of their songs. Cottrill and Wnukowski claimed that they authored, recorded and copyrighted a song called "What You See Is What You Get" in 1999 to one of Spears's representatives for consideration on a future album, though it was rejected. The case was later dismissed after it was ruled that they lacked sufficient evidence and that there "weren't enough similarities between the two songs to prove copyright infringement."

== Track listing ==
Standard edition
| No. | Title | Writer(s) | Producer(s) | Length |
|---|---|---|---|---|
| 1. | "Oops!... I Did It Again" | Max Martin; Rami Yacoub | Martin; Yacoub | 3:31 |
| 2. | "Stronger" | Martin; Yacoub | Martin; Yacoub | 3:23 |
| 3. | "Don't Go Knockin' on My Door" | Martin; Yacoub; Jake Schulze; Alexander Kronlund | Jake; Yacoub | 3:43 |
| 4. | "(I Can't Get No) Satisfaction" | Mick Jagger; Keith Richards | Rodney Jerkins | 4:23 |
| 5. | "Don't Let Me Be the Last to Know" | Robert John "Mutt" Lange; Shania Twain; Keith Scott | Lange | 3:50 |
| 6. | "What U See (Is What U Get)" | Per Magnusson; David Kreuger; Jörgen Elofsson; Yacoub | Magnusson; Kreuger; Yacoub | 3:36 |
| 7. | "Lucky" | Martin; Yacoub; Kronlund | Martin; Yacoub | 3:26 |
| 8. | "One Kiss from You" | Steve Lunt | Lunt; Larry "Rock" Campbell | 3:23 |
| 9. | "Where Are You Now" | Martin; Andreas Carlsson | Martin; Yacoub | 4:39 |
| 10. | "Can't Make You Love Me" | Kristian Lundin; Carlsson; Martin | Lundin; Jake | 3:17 |
| 11. | "When Your Eyes Say It" | Diane Warren | Lunt; Robert "Esmail" Jazayeri; Paul Umbach^{[a]} | 4:29 |
| 12. | "Dear Diary" | Britney Spears; Jason Blume; Eugene Wilde | Timmy Allen; Barry J. Eastmond | 2:46 |
| Total length: | | | | 44:26 |

25th anniversary edition
| No. | Title | Writer(s) | Producer(s) | Length |
|---|---|---|---|---|
| 13. | "Girl in the Mirror" | Elofsson | Magnusson; Kreuger | 3:36 |
| 14. | "You Got It All" | Rupert Holmes | Eric Foster White | 4:10 |
| 15. | "Heart" | George Teren; Wilde | Lunt; Campbell | 3:31 |
| 16. | "Walk On By" | Elofsson; Kreuger | Magnusson; Kreuger | 3:36 |
| 17. | "Oops!... I Did It Again" (Riprock 'n' Alex G. Oops! We Remixed It Again! Radio Edit) | Martin; Rami | Martin; Rami; Brad Daymond^{[b]}; Alex Greggs^{[b]} | 3:56 |
| 18. | "Lucky" (Jack D. Elliot Radio Mix) | Martin; Yacoub; Kronlund | Martin; Rami; Jack D. Elliot^{[b]} | 3:29 |
| 19. | "Stronger" (Miguel Migs Vocal Edit) | Martin; Yacoub | Martin; Rami; Miguel Migs^{[b]} | 3:43 |
| 20. | "Don't Let Me Be the Last to Know" (Thunderpuss Radio Mix) | Lange; Twain; Scott | Lange; Thunderpuss^{[b]} | 4:24 |
| 21. | "Stronger" (Adamusic Remix) | Martin; Yacoub | Martin; Rami; Adam Wright^{[b]} | 3:36 |
| 22. | "Oops!... I Did It Again" (Pessto Remix) | Martin; Yacoub | Martin; Rami; Pessto^{[b]} | 2:35 |
| Total length: | | | | 81:02 |

=== Notes ===
- ^{^[a]} signifies a vocal producer
- ^{^[b]} signifies an additional producer
- Track 13 was initially available as international bonus track.
- Track 13 and 14 were initially available as Asian bonus tracks.
- Track 14 and 15 were initially available as Japanese bonus tracks.
- Australian special edition bonus disc includes the original album version, the Hex Hector Radio Mix and the Hex Hector Club Mix of "Don't Let Me Be the Last to Know", the MacQuayle Mix Show Edit and Pablo La Rosa's Tranceformation of "Stronger" and music videos for "Oops!... I Did It Again", "Lucky", "Stronger", and "Don't Let Me Be the Last to Know".
- Asian special edition bonus disc features music videos for "Oops!... I Did It Again", "Lucky", and "Stronger", along with karaoke versions of the same three songs.

== Personnel ==
Credits are adapted from the liner notes of Oops!... I Did It Again.

- Gloria Agostini – harp
- Amahid Ajemian – violin
- Sanford Allen – violin
- Timmy Allen – production
- John Amatiello – engineering
- Therese Ancker – backing vocals
- Darryl Anthony – backing vocals
- Stephanie Baer – backing vocals, viola
- Julien Barber – viola
- Sandra Billingslea – violin
- Charlotte Björkman – backing vocals
- Elan Bongiorno – make-up
- Alfred Bosco – engineering assistance
- Alfred V. Brown – orchestral contracting, viola
- Bobby Brown – engineering assistance
- Larry "Rock" Campbell – bass, drum programming, guitar, production
- Johan Carlberg – guitar
- Cory Churko – programming
- Kevin Churko – programming
- Tom Coyne – mastering
- Marji Danilow – bass
- Tim Donovan – engineering
- Barry J. Eastmond – conducting, engineering, keyboards, orchestral arrangement, piano, production
- Michel Gallone – engineering, mixing engineering
- Winterton Garvey – violin
- Eric Gast – engineering
- Dan Gellert – engineering
- Stephen George – mixing engineering
- Nigel Green – mixing
- Nikki Gregoroff – backing vocals
- Joyce Hammann – violin
- Nana Hedin – backing vocals
- Richard Henrickson – concertmastering, violin
- Hayley Hill – styling
- Ashley Horne – violin
- Stanley Hunte – violin
- Regis Iandiorio – violin
- Jake – keyboards, mixing engineering, production, programming
- Robert "Esmail" Jazayeri – drum programming, keyboards, production
- Rodney Jerkins – engineering, mixing engineering, production, vocal arrangement
- Kali – hair styling
- Olivia Koppell – viola
- David Kreuger – keyboards, mixing engineering, production, programming
- Robert John "Mutt" Lange – production
- Jeanne LeBlanc – cello
- Jesse Levy – cello
- Thomas Lindberg – bass
- Kristian Lundin – keyboards, mixing engineering, production, programming
- Steve Lunt – A&R, production, songwriting, string arrangements
- Margaret Magill – violin
- Per Magnusson – keyboards, mixing engineering, production, programming
- Audrey Martells – backing vocals
- Max Martin – keyboards, mixing engineering, production, programming, vocals
- Harvey Mason, Jr. – engineering
- Harvey Mason, Sr. – editing
- Charles McCrorey – engineering, engineering assistance
- William Meade – string coordination
- Richard Meyer – programming
- Kermit Moore – cello
- Eugene J. Moye – cello
- Jackie Murphy – art direction, design
- Esbjörn Öhrwall – guitar
- Jeanette Olsson – backing vocals
- Gene Orloff – violin
- Flip Osman – engineering assistance
- Nora Payne – backing vocals
- Marion Pinhiero – violin
- Jon Ragel – photography
- Rami – keyboards, mixing engineering, production, programming
- Maxine Roach – viola
- Anthony Ruotolo – engineering assistance
- Mark Seliger – photography
- Dexter Simmons – mixing engineering
- Jeanette Söderholm – backing vocals
- Britney Spears – conceptualization, songwriting, vocals
- Shane Stoneback – engineering assistance
- Judith Sugarman – bass
- Marti Sweet – violin
- Gerald Tarack – violin
- Chris Tergesen – string engineering
- Michael Thompson – guitar
- Chris Trevett – engineering, mixing engineering, vocal engineering
- Michael Tucker – vocal engineering
- Andres Von Hofsten – backing vocals
- Belinda Whitney-Barratt – violin
- Clayton Wood – engineering assistance
- Kent Wood – keyboards
- Nina Woodford – backing vocals
- Johnny Wright – management
- Mona Yacoub – backing vocals
- Harry Zaratzian – viola
- Xin Zhao – violin

== Charts ==
=== Weekly charts ===
2000–2001 weekly chart performance
| Chart (2000–2001) | Peak position |
|---|---|
| Argentine Albums (CAPIF) | 1 |
| Australian Albums (ARIA) | 2 |
| Australian Dance Albums (ARIA) | 1 |
| Austrian Albums (Ö3 Austria) | 1 |
| Belgian Albums (Ultratop Flanders) | 1 |
| Belgian Albums (Ultratop Wallonia) | 1 |
| Canada Top Albums/CDs (RPM) | 1 |
| Colombian Albums (ASINCOL) | 1 |
| Czech Albums (ČNS IFPI) | 4 |
| Danish Albums (Hitlisten) | 2 |
| Dutch Albums (Album Top 100) | 1 |
| Estonian Albums (Eesti Top 10) | 3 |
| European Top 100 Albums (Music & Media) | 1 |
| Finnish Albums (Suomen virallinen lista) | 2 |
| French Albums (SNEP) | 1 |
| German Albums (Offizielle Top 100) | 1 |
| Greek Albums (IFPI) | 1 |
| Hungarian Albums (MAHASZ) | 1 |
| Icelandic Albums (Tónlistinn) | 1 |
| Irish Albums (IRMA) | 3 |
| Italian Albums (FIMI) | 5 |
| Japanese Albums (Oricon) | 4 |
| Malaysian Albums (RIM) | 2 |
| New Zealand Albums (RMNZ) | 2 |
| Norwegian Albums (VG-lista) | 1 |
| Polish Albums (ZPAV) | 10 |
| Portuguese Albums (AFP) | 1 |
| Scottish Albums (OCC) | 1 |
| Singaporean Albums (SPVA) | 1 |
| Slovak Albums (IFPI) | 4 |
| Spanish Albums (Promusicae) | 2 |
| Swedish Albums (Sverigetopplistan) | 1 |
| Swiss Albums (Schweizer Hitparade) | 1 |
| UK Albums (Official Charts) | 2 |
| UK Independent Albums (Official Charts) | 1 |
| US Billboard 200 | 1 |

2019–2025 weekly chart performance
| Chart (2020–2025) | Peak position |
|---|---|
| Spanish Albums (PROMUSICAE) | 89 |
| Spanish Vinyl Albums (PROMUSICAE) | 13 |
| UK Album Downloads (OCC) | 41 |
| UK Album Sales (OCC) | 83 |
| US Top Album Sales (Billboard) | 39 |
| US Vinyl Albums (Billboard) | 2 |

=== Monthly charts ===
Monthly chart performance
| Chart (2000) | Peak position |
|---|---|
| South Korean International Albums (RIAK) | 4 |

=== Seasonal charts ===
Seasonal chart performance
| Chart (2000) | Position |
|---|---|
| Norwegian Spring Albums (VG-lista) | 6 |
| Norwegian End-of-School Albums (VG-lista) | 1 |
| Norwegian Summer Albums (VG-lista) | 14 |
| South Korean Mid-Year International Albums (RIAK) | 4 |

=== Year-end charts ===
2000 year-end chart performance
| Chart (2000) | Position |
|---|---|
| Australian Albums (ARIA) | 14 |
| Austrian Albums (Ö3 Austria) | 5 |
| Belgian Albums (Ultratop Flanders) | 8 |
| Belgian Albums (Ultratop Wallonia) | 3 |
| Canadian Albums (Nielsen SoundScan) | 2 |
| Danish Albums (Hitlisten) | 16 |
| Dutch Albums (MegaCharts) | 13 |
| Estonian Albums (Eesti Top 10) | 1 |
| European Top 100 Albums (Billboard) | 3 |
| Finnish Albums (Suomen virallinen lista) | 10 |
| French Albums (SNEP) | 20 |
| German Albums (Offizielle Top 100) | 3 |
| Japanese Albums (Oricon) | 86 |
| New Zealand Albums (RMNZ) | 13 |
| Singaporean English Albums (SPVA) | 4 |
| South Korean International Albums (RIAK) | 10 |
| Spanish Albums (AFYVE) | 27 |
| Swiss Albums (Schweizer Hitparade) | 4 |
| UK Albums (OCC) | 19 |
| US Billboard 200 | 4 |

2001 year-end chart performance
| Chart (2001) | Position |
|---|---|
| Austrian Albums (Ö3 Austria) | 68 |
| Belgian Albums (Ultratop Flanders) | 75 |
| Belgian Albums (Ultratop Wallonia) | 89 |
| Canadian Albums (Nielsen SoundScan) | 105 |
| European Top 100 Albums (Music & Media) | 60 |
| French Albums (SNEP) | 129 |
| German Albums (Offizielle Top 100) | 69 |
| Swiss Albums (Schweizer Hitparade) | 50 |
| UK Albums (OCC) | 162 |
| US Billboard 200 | 28 |

=== Decade-end charts ===
Decade-end chart performance
| Chart (2000–2009) | Position |
|---|---|
| US Billboard 200 | 6 |

=== Centurial charts ===
21st century chart performance
| Chart (2001–present) | Position |
|---|---|
| UK Female Albums (OCC) | 77 |
| US Billboard 200 | 127 |

=== All-time charts ===
All-time chart performance
| Chart | Position |
|---|---|
| US Billboard 200 | 64 |

== Certifications and sales ==
Certifications and sales
| Region | Certification | Certified units/sales |
|---|---|---|
| Argentina (CAPIF) | Platinum | 120,000 |
| Australia (ARIA) | 3× Platinum | 210,000^{^} |
| Austria (IFPI Austria) | 2× Platinum | 100,000^{*} |
| Belgium (BRMA) | 3× Platinum | 150,000^{*} |
| Brazil (Pro-Música Brasil) | Gold | 250,000 |
| Canada (Music Canada) | 5× Platinum | 710,044 |
| Denmark | — | 47,621 |
| Finland (Musiikkituottajat) | Platinum | 54,274 |
| France (SNEP) | Platinum | 300,000^{*} |
| Germany (BVMI) | 3× Platinum | 900,000^{^} |
| Hungary (MAHASZ) | Gold | 25,000^{^} |
| Iceland | — | 5,000 |
| Italy (FIMI) | Platinum | 100,000 |
| Japan (RIAJ) | Platinum | 242,400 |
| Malaysia (RIM) | Platinum | 25,000 |
| Mexico (AMPROFON) | 2× Platinum | 300,000^{^} |
| Netherlands (NVPI) | 2× Platinum | 160,000^{^} |
| New Zealand (RMNZ) Physical sales | 2× Platinum | 30,000^{^} |
| New Zealand (RMNZ) Digital sales + streaming | Gold | 7,500^{‡} |
| Norway (IFPI Norway) | Platinum | 50,000^{*} |
| Philippines (PARI) | 2× Platinum | |
| Poland (ZPAV) | Platinum | 100,000^{*} |
| South Korea | — | 263,068 |
| Spain (Promusicae) | 2× Platinum | 200,000^{^} |
| Sweden (GLF) | Platinum | 130,000 |
| Switzerland (IFPI Switzerland) | 2× Platinum | 100,000^{^} |
| United Kingdom (BPI) | 3× Platinum | 917,000 |
| United States (RIAA) | Diamond | 10,411,000 (Note: As of December 2010, Oops!...I Did It Again has sold 9,201,000 copies in the United States according to Nielsen SoundScan, with additional 1,210,000 copies sold at BMG Music Clubs. Nielsen SoundScan does not count copies sold through clubs like the BMG Music Service, which were significantly popular in the 1990s.) |
| Uruguay (CUD) | Platinum | 6,000^{^} |
Summaries
| Europe (IFPI) | 4× Platinum | 4,000,000^{*} |
| Worldwide | — | 20,000,000 |
^{*} Sales figures based on certification alone.^{^} Shipments figures based on certification alone.

== Release history ==
Release dates and formats
| Region | Date | Edition(s) | Format(s) | Label(s) | Ref. |
|---|---|---|---|---|---|
| Japan | May 3, 2000 | Standard | CD | Avex Trax | |
| Argentina | May 15, 2000 | Standard | CD | EMI | |
| Australia | May 15, 2000 | Standard | CD | Zomba | |
| Germany | May 15, 2000 | Standard | CD | Rough Trade | |
| United Kingdom | May 15, 2000 | Standard | Cassette; CD | Jive | |
| Canada | May 16, 2000 | Standard | CD | Zomba | |
| France | May 16, 2000 | Standard | CD | Virgin | |
| South Korea | May 16, 2000 | Standard | Cassette; CD | Rock | |
| United States | May 16, 2000 | Standard | Cassette; CD | Jive | |
| United Kingdom | October 9, 2000 | Special | Enhanced CD | Jive | |
| Australia | March 23, 2001 | Special | CD + enhanced CD | Zomba | |
| Various | August 14, 2020 | Standard | Vinyl (Note: Prior to the 2020 picture disc release, Oops!... I Did It Again was made available on limited-edition vinyl exclusively at Urban Outfitters on April 26, 2019. The album was globally reissued on vinyl on March 31, 2023.) | Legacy | |
| Various | May 16, 2025 | 25th anniversary | Digital download; streaming; vinyl | Legacy | |

== See also ==
- Teen pop
- Britney Spears discography
- List of Billboard 200 number-one albums of 2000
- List of number-one albums of 2000 (Canada)
- List of number-one albums of 2000 (Germany)
- List of number-one albums of 2000 (Portugal)
- List of Oricon number-one albums of 2000
- List of best-selling albums
- List of best-selling albums by women
- List of best-selling albums in the United States
- List of fastest-selling albums
