= ...Baby One More Time Tour =

1999 concert tour by Britney Spears

- Continental tour by Britney Spears
- Official tour programme cover
- Location: North America
- Associated album: ...Baby One More Time
- Start date: June 28, 1999
- End date: September 15, 1999
- Legs: 1
- No. of shows: 57

Britney Spears concert chronology
- ...Baby One More Time Tour (1999); (You Drive Me) Crazy Tour (2000)

The ...Baby One More Time Tour was the debut concert tour by American entertainer Britney Spears. It supported her debut studio album, ...Baby One More Time (1999), and visited the United States and Canada. The tour was announced in March 1999, with dates released a month later. Tommy Hilfiger was chosen as the tour sponsor. The show was divided into various segments, with each segment being followed by an interlude to the next segment, and it ended with an encore. The setlist consisted of songs from her debut album and several covers. The tour received positive feedback from critics; many highlighted Spears' persona and edgy look.

== Background and development ==
On March 5, 1999, it was reported that Spears was planning her first headlining tour to support her first studio album, ...Baby One More Time (1999). Shortly after, she announced that the tour would start in July. On May 12, 1999, Tommy Hilfiger was announced as the main tour sponsor. During the time of the announcement, Spears was being featured in the "AllStars" campaign launched by the company. Hilfiger spoke about the sponsorship saying,

"My passion for music has always inspired my designs. This year we have really put music in the forefront of everything we do. Britney represents the spirit of Tommy Jeans and of youth today. I cannot think of a better way to continue this exciting year by sponsoring one of today's hottest, young recording artists".

The secondary sponsor was supposed to be Nestlé, but they pulled out soon after provocative photographs of Spears shot by David LaChapelle were published in Rolling Stone. Tour dates were released through Pollstar on April 9, 1999, with the tour kicking off on June 28, 1999, in Pompano Beach, Florida. Several dates were added and rescheduled, and the complete schedule was released two months later.

Spears talked to CNN about her involvement during the development of the tour, stating that she had designed the entire tour herself, including costumes and concept. Spears worked with fashion designer Gia Ventola to create the costumes for her and the dancers. The proscenium stage was simple and had only one main prop, a staircase in the middle. The band was in both sides of the staircase and consisted of five musicians. There were also six dancers, that took the stage during interludes. The setlist consisted of seven songs from her debut album and several covers by well-known artists.

== Concert synopsis ==
The show began with a dance introduction by Spears' dancers among smoke effects. She appeared shortly after at the top of the staircase wearing a hot pink vinyl tube top and white vinyl pants with pink knee patches, to perform "(You Drive Me) Crazy". In "Soda Pop", she danced and interacted with the audience, before leaving the stage while her dancers continued. She appeared sitting on the staircase to sing "Born to Make You Happy" and "From the Bottom of My Broken Heart". The show continued with a dance interlude set to Madonna's "Vogue" in which she named Madonna and Janet Jackson as her biggest inspirations. She then took the stage to perform a cover of Madonna's "Material Girl". After this, she performed two covers of Janet Jackson songs, "Black Cat" and "Nasty". She ended the section with a performance of Sonny & Cher's "The Beat Goes On", accompanied by psychedelic lights. After a dance interlude, she performed the album track "I Will Be There" and a cover of "Open Arms" by Journey, ending with a smile at the top of the staircase. After "Sometimes", she waved and left the stage. The encore consisted of a performance of "...Baby One More Time", in which Spears wore a black bra under pink halter, a pink sequined plaid mini-skirt, and black thigh-high stockings. She then thanks the audience and leaves the stage.

== Critical reception ==
The tour garnered generally positive reviews from critics. Jeffrey Haney of the Deseret News described the show as "funky and flashy". A reporter from USA Today called Spears' performance "assured and energetic". Jim Farber of the New York Daily News pointed out that Spears seemed to have two personas during the show, one when singing songs from her album and a more edgy look when singing the covers. He also added that "Spears' nods to edginess no doubt reflects her desire to grow into a more mature career". Jane Ganahl of the San Francisco Chronicle said that "she may be somewhat entertaining, but she's also just another prefab act – longer on packaging than actual talent".

== Broadcasts and recordings ==
In August 1999, the concert in Orlando, Florida was filmed for the Disney Channel in Concert series which Spears was also joined by New Kids on the Block member Joey McIntyre (who was embarking on his solo career). The concert entitled Britney Spears and Joey McIntyre in Concert aired on October 16, 1999. In the special, Spears performed seven songs in front of the Rock 'n' Roller Coaster Starring Aerosmith attraction at the Disney Hollywood Studios. It also featured Spears visiting her former routes working at the park during her years of The Mickey Mouse Club and shopping at Downtown Disney with her dancers.

== Opening acts ==
- C-Note (select venues)
- Steps (select venues)
- Boyz N Girlz United (select venues)
- P.Y.T. (select venues)
- Michael Fredo (select venues)
- 3rd Storee (select venues)
- Divine (select venues)
- Sky (select venues)
- Joey McIntyre (Orlando)

== Setlist ==
The following setlist was obtained from the concert held on July 29, 1999, at the Paramount Theatre in Oakland, California. It does not represent all concerts for the duration of the tour.

1. "(You Drive Me) Crazy"
2. "Soda Pop"
3. "Born to Make You Happy"
4. "From the Bottom of My Broken Heart"
5. "Material Girl" / "Black Cat" / "Nasty"
6. "The Beat Goes On"
7. "I Will Be There"
8. "Open Arms"
9. "Sometimes"
  Encore
10. "...Baby One More Time"

== Tour dates ==
Date	City	Country	Venue
June 28, 1999	Pompano Beach	United States	Pompano Beach Amphitheatre
June 29, 1999	Tampa	United States	USF Sun Dome
July 1, 1999	Atlanta	United States	Atlanta Civic Center
July 2, 1999	North Myrtle Beach	United States	House of Blues
July 3, 1999	Doswell	United States	Paramount Theatre
July 4, 1999 (Note: Part of the 1999 "A Day in the Garden" Festival.)	Bethel	United States	Max Yasgur's Farm
July 5, 1999	Bethel	United States	Max Yasgur's Farm
July 6, 1999	Washington, D.C.	United States	DAR Constitution Hall
July 7, 1999	New York City	United States	Hammerstein Ballroom
July 8, 1999	Hershey	United States	Star Pavilion
July 9, 1999	Scranton	United States	Montage Mountain Performing Arts Center
July 10, 1999	Darien	United States	Darien Lake Performing Arts Center
July 11, 1999 (Note: Originally scheduled at Palace Theatre in Albany.)	Schenectady	United States	Proctor's Theatre
July 13, 1999	Hamilton	Canada	Copps Coliseum
July 14, 1999 (Note: Originally scheduled on July 17.)	Toronto	Canada	Molson Amphitheatre
July 16, 1999 (Note: Originally scheduled on July 14 at Verdun Auditorium.)	Montreal	Canada	Molson Centre
July 17, 1999 (Note: Originally scheduled on July 16 at Ottawa Civic Centre Theatre.)	Ottawa	Canada	Corel Centre
July 20, 1999	Winnipeg	Canada	Centennial Concert Hall
July 21, 1999 (Note: Originally scheduled at Saskatoon Centennial Auditorium.)	Saskatoon	Canada	Saskatchewan Place
July 22, 1999 (Note: Originally scheduled on July 23 at Edmonton Convention Centre.)	Edmonton	Canada	Skyreach Centre
July 23, 1999	Calgary	Canada	Canadian Airlines Saddledome
July 25, 1999 (Note: Originally scheduled at Plaza of Nations.)	Vancouver	Canada	General Motors Place
July 26, 1999	Seattle	United States	KeyArena
July 27, 1999 (Note: Part of the Washington County Fair.)	Hillsboro	United States	DeMar Batchelor Amphitheater
July 29, 1999	Oakland	United States	Paramount Theatre
July 30, 1999 (Note: Part of California Mid-State Fair.)	Paso Robles	United States	CMS Grandstand Arena
July 31, 1999	Los Angeles	United States	Universal Amphitheatre
August 3, 1999 (Note: Part of the Adams County Fair.)	Brighton	United States	Bromley Companies Stage
August 4, 1999	Denver	United States	Paramount Theatre
August 6, 1999	Arlington	United States	AT&T Music Mill Amphitheater
August 7, 1999	Houston	United States	Aerial Theater
August 8, 1999 (Note: Originally scheduled at Saenger Theatre.)	New Orleans	United States	Lakefront Arena
August 9, 1999 (Note: This appearance was part of L'Oreal's Summer Music Mania, a pop music concert that was broadcast on UPN later that month (August 1999). The event featured multiple other artists, including NSYNC, 98 Degrees, Christina Aguilera, 702, B*Witched and Jessica Simpson, among others. Spears, a headliner, performed three numbers: "(You Drive Me) Crazy", "Sometimes" and "...Baby One More Time". The concert also served as a promotional event for the film Drive Me Crazy (1999), as it was hosted by the film's lead actress, Melissa Joan Hart; the teen movie also featured Spears' single "(You Drive Me) Crazy" as its theme song, with the accompanying music video starring Hart and other actors from the film.)	Chula Vista	United States	North Island Credit Union Amphitheatre
August 10, 1999	Memphis	United States	Mud Island Amphitheater
August 11, 1999 (Note: Originally scheduled at Ryman Auditorium.)	Nashville	United States	Grand Ole Opry House
August 13, 1999	Eureka	United States	Old Glory Amphitheater
August 14, 1999 (Note: Part of Douglas County Fair and Expos.)	Omaha	United States	Ak-Sar-Ben Arena
August 15, 1999 (Note: Part of the Sioux Empire Fair.)	Sioux Falls	United States	W.H. Lyon Fairgrounds Grandstand
August 17, 1999	Rosemont	United States	Rosemont Theatre
August 18, 1999	Columbus	United States	Veterans Memorial Auditorium
August 19, 1999 (Note: Part of the State Fair of West Virginia.)	Fairlea	United States	State Fair Event Center
August 20, 1999 (Note: Part of the Lenawee County Fair.)	Adrian	United States	Lenawee County Event Grounds Bandshell
August 21, 1999	Orlando	United States	Hard Rock Live
August 25, 1999	Indianapolis	United States	Murat Theatre
August 26, 1999	Cleveland	United States	Nautica Stage
August 27, 1999	Mason	United States	Timberwolf Amphitheatre
August 29, 1999	Upper Darby	United States	Tower Theater
August 30, 1999 (Note: Part of the Champlain Valley Fair and Expo.)	Essex	United States	Coca-Cola Grandstand
September 1, 1999	Boston	United States	FleetBoston Pavilion
September 2, 1999 (Note: Part of the Great New York State Fair.)	Geddes	United States	Mohegan Sun Grandstand
September 3, 1999	Wallingford	United States	SNET Oakdale Theatre
September 4, 1999	Baltimore	United States	Pier 6 Pavilion
September 5, 1999 (Note: Part of the Great Allentown Fair.)	Allentown	United States	Allentown Fairgrounds Grandstand
September 10, 1999 (Note: Part of the Utah State Fair.)	Salt Lake City	United States	Utah State Fair Grandstand
September 11, 1999 (Note: Part of the Kansas State Fair.)	Hutchinson	United States	KSF Grandstand
September 12, 1999 (Note: Originally scheduled on August 24, 1999.)	Detroit	United States	State Theatre
September 14, 1999 (Note: Part of Allegan County Fair.)	Allegan	United States	ACC Grandstand
September 15, 1999 (Note: Part of York Interstate Fair.)	York	United States	Grandstand at the York Fair

=== Cancelled dates ===
Date	City	Country	Venue
July 13, 1999	Quebec City	Canada	Agora du Vieux-Port
August 1, 1999	Las Vegas	United States	House of Blues

== Selected box office data ==
Venue	City	Tickets sold / available	Gross revenue
Star Pavilion	Hershey	7,628 / 7,628 (100%)	$183,925
Darien Lake Performing Arts Center	Darien	8,804 / 10,000 (88%)	$176,293
Corel Centre	Ottawa	9,202 / 9,202 (100%)	$177,853
Saskatchewan Place	Saskatoon	8,719 / 8,719 (100%)	$166,407
Skyreach Centre	Edmonton	9,263 / 9,263 (100%)	$176,529
Canadian Airlines Saddledome	Calgary	10,620 / 10,620 (100%)	$201,766
General Motors Place	Vancouver	10,804 / 10,804 (100%)	$195,624
Mohegan Sun Grandstand	Geddes	17,059 / 17,059 (100%)	$439,401
Total		82,099 / 83,295 (98%)	$1,717,798
