= Am I Dreaming =

Am I Dreaming may refer to:

- "Am I Dreaming" (Kat DeLuna song), released in 2007
- "Am I Dreaming" (Metro Boomin, ASAP Rocky and Roisee song), released in 2023
- "Am I Dreaming", a song by Atlantic Starr from their 1981 album Radiant
- "Am I Dreaming", a song by Lil Nas X from Montero, 2021
