= Radiant (Atlantic Starr album) =

Studio album by Atlantic Starr
- Released: February 3, 1981
- Recorded: August–November 1980
- Studios: Sigma Sound Studios (New York City, New York); Motown/Hitsville U.S.A. (Los Angeles, California)
- Genres: R&B, soul
- Length: 37:21
- Label: A&M
- Producer: James Anthony Carmichael

Atlantic Starr chronology
Straight to the Point (1979)	Radiant (1981)	Brilliance (1982)

Radiant is the third studio album by American R&B band Atlantic Starr, released in February 1981 on A&M Records. This album peaked at No. 5 on the US Billboard Top Soul Albums chart and No. 47 on the US Billboard Top LPs and Tape.

== Background ==
Radiant was produced by veteran Motown producer James Anthony Carmichael, best known for his work with the Jackson 5 and Commodores. Songs "When Love Calls", "Send for Me", and "Am I Dreaming" were released from the album as singles.

== Critical reception ==
Professional ratings
Review scores
Source	Rating
AllMusic	4.5/5 stars

AllMusic's Alex Henderson said, "This 1981 release was the first album that Carmichael produced for the band, whose two previous LPs (Atlantic Starr in 1978 and Straight to the Point in 1979) were decent but not great... Carmichael deserves much of the credit -- he pushed the Lewis Brothers to excel just as he pushed Bryant to excel. With Carmichael's help, Radiant went down in history as one Atlantic Starr's finest and most essential albums."

== Track listing ==
No.	Title	Writer(s)	Length
1.	"When Love Calls"	David Lewis, Wayne Lewis	4:33
2.	"Does It Matter"	David Lewis, Earl Cole, Jr.	4:28
3.	"Think About That"	David Lewis, Wayne Lewis	5:02
4.	"Send for Me"	Sam Dees, Ron Kersey	5:28
5.	"Mystery Girl"	David Lewis, Wayne Lewis	4:27
6.	"Am I Dreaming"	Sam Dees	5:37
7.	"Under Pressure"	Jon Lind, John McNally, Bill Gable	4:05
8.	"My Turn Now"	Harold Johnson	4:38

== Personnel ==
Atlantic Starr

- Sharon Bryant – vocals, lead vocals (1, 6, 8)
- Wayne Lewis – keyboards, vocals, lead vocals (3, 4, 7)
- David Lewis – guitars, vocals, lead vocals (2, 6)
- Clifford Archer – bass
- Porter Carroll Jr. – drums, vocals, lead vocals (5)
- Joseph Phillips – percussion
- Koran Daniels – saxophones
- Jonathan Lewis – trombone
- William Suddeth III – trumpet

Guest musician

- Albert "Duke" Jones Jr. – trumpet, flugelhorn

Music arrangements

- James Anthony Carmichael
- David Lewis (1–3, 5)
- Wayne Lewis (1–3, 5)
- Atlantic Starr (4, 6–8)

=== Production ===
- James Anthony Carmichael – producer
- Calvin Harris – engineer
- Bernie Grundman – mastering at A&M Studios (Hollywood, California)
- Chuck Beeson – art direction
- Lynn Robb – design
- Ted Witus – logo design, logo lettering
- George DuBose – photography
- Carmen Efferson – hair stylist for Sharon Bryant
- Earl Cole – management

== Charts ==
=== Weekly charts ===
Chart (1981)	Peak position
US Billboard Top LPs and Tape	47
US Billboard Top Soul LPs	5

=== Year-end charts ===
Chart (1981)	Position
US Top R&B/Hip-Hop Albums (Billboard)	14

=== Singles ===
Year	Single	Chart positions	
Year	Single	US R&B	US Dance
1981	"Send for Me"	16	—
1981	"When Love Calls"	5	80
