= Straight to the Point =

Straight to the Point may refer to:

- Straight to the Point (Atlantic Starr album), 1979
- Straight to the Point (Art Porter Jr. album), 1993
- Straight to the Point (Damion Hall album), 1994
