= As the Band Turns =

Studio album by Atlantic Starr
- Released: April 15, 1985
- Recorded: 1984−1985
- Studios: Soundcastle (Hollywood, California); Devonshire Sound Studios and Artisan Sound Recorders (North Hollywood, California); Hitsville U.S.A. and Studio Masters (Los Angeles, California); Calvin Harris Studio (Encino, California); Minot Sound (White Plains, New York); Golden Apple Media (New York City, New York)
- Genre: R&B
- Length: 41:24
- Label: A&M
- Producers: Wayne Lewis; David Lewis; Joey Gallo; Calvin Harris; Wardell Potts Jr.

Atlantic Starr chronology
Yours Forever (1983)	As the Band Turns (1985)	Secret Lovers... The Best Of Atlantic Starr (1986)

Singles from As the Band Turns
- 1. "Freak-a-Ristic" Released: 1985; 2. "Cool Calm Collected" Released: 1985; 3. "Silver Shadow" Released: 1985; 4. "Secret Lovers" Released: 1985; 5. "If Your Heart Isn't in It" Released: 1986

Professional ratings
Review scores
Source	Rating
AllMusic	4/5 stars
Sounds	4¼/5

As the Band Turns is the sixth album by R&B band Atlantic Starr, released April 15, 1985, on A&M Records. Following the departure of initial lead singer Sharon Bryant, as well as four other members of the band (drummer Porter Carroll, Jr; bassist Clifford Archer, trumpeter William Sudderth III, and saxophonist Koran Daniels). As the Band Turns sees the introduction of new vocalist Barbara Weathers. This proved to be one of the band's more successful releases, yielding several R&B hits, such as "Freak-A-Ristic," "If Your Heart Isn't In It" (written by former Average White Band vocalist Hamish Stuart), and the smash quiet storm anthem "Secret Lovers." This would be the band's last release for A&M after a memorable, although inconsistent, run of hits throughout the early 80's.

== Track listing ==
1. "Freak-A-Ristic" (David Lewis) - 4:05
2. "Cool, Calm, Collected" (Joey Gallo, Pamela Phillips Oland, Wardell Potts Jr.) - 4:04
3. "One Love" (David Lewis, Wayne Lewis) - 3:52
4. "In the Heat of Passion" (Wayne Lewis, Wardell Potts Jr., William Shelby) - 4:38
5. "If Your Heart Isn't In It" (Hamish Stuart) - 4:02
6. "Silver Shadow" (David Lewis, Wayne Lewis) - 4:53
7. "Let's Start It Over" (Joey Gallo, Pamela Phillips Oland, Wardell Potts Jr.) - 5:33
8. "Secret Lovers" (David Lewis, Wayne Lewis) - 5:30
9. "Thank You" (David Lewis, Wayne Lewis) - 4:29

== Personnel ==
Atlantic Starr

- Wayne Lewis – lead vocals (1, 5, 7), backing vocals (1, 2), keyboards (1, 3–9)
- Jonathan Lewis – keyboards, trombone
- David Lewis – guitars (1–4, 6–9), drum machine programming (1, 6, 8, 9), backing vocals (1, 2, 4–9) lead vocals (2–4, 8, 9)
- Joseph Phillips – percussion
- Barbara Weathers – lead vocals (5, 6, 8), backing vocals (6–8)

Additional musicians

- John Barnes – keyboards (1, 3), additional keyboards (9)
- Bill Bottrell – keyboard programming (1), additional keyboards (1)
- Derek Nakamoto – keyboard programming (1, 3)
- William "Dr. Z" Zimmerman – additional keyboards (1), keyboards (7)
- Joey Gallo – keyboards (2, 4, 7)
- William Shelby – keyboards (4)
- Calvin Harris – keyboard programming (5)
- Rex Salas – keyboards (5)
- Clare Fischer – synthesizer string performance (6, 8)
- Craig Harris – synthesizer string programming (6, 8)
- David Cochrane – guitars (1, 3, 4, 9), guitar solo (1), saxophone solo (5)
- Barry "Sonjohn" Johnson – bass guitar (5, 9)
- Wardell Potts Jr. – drums (2, 4, 7), percussion (2, 4, 7)
- Jonathan Moffett – drums (3)
- Derek Organ – drums (5)
- Paulinho da Costa – percussion (1, 3, 5, 6, 8, 9)
- Damon Rentie – saxophone ending (5)
- Dana Meyers – backing vocals (4)
- Darryl Phinnessee – backing vocals (5)
- Phyllis St. James – backing vocals (5)
- Krystal Davis – backing vocals (9)
- Fonzi Thornton – backing vocals (9)

Music arrangements

- David Lewis – arrangements (1, 3, 6, 8, 9)
- Wayne Lewis – arrangements (1, 3, 6, 8, 9)
- Atlantic Starr – arrangements (2, 4, 5, 7)
- Joey Gallo – arrangements (2, 7)
- Wardell Potts Jr. – arrangements (2, 4, 7)
- Gene Page – horn arrangements (3), string arrangements (3, 5)
- Hamish Stuart – arrangements (5)
- Clare Fischer – synthesizer string arrangements (6, 8), horn and string arrangements (9)

== Production ==
- David Lewis – producer (1, 3, 5, 6, 8, 9)
- Wayne Lewis – producer (1, 3, 5, 6, 8, 9)
- Jonathan Lewis – associate producer (1, 3, 5, 6, 8, 9)
- Joey Gallo – producer (2, 4, 7)
- Wardell Potts Jr. – producer (2, 4, 7)
- Calvin Harris – producer (5)
- Chuck Beeson – art direction
- Larry Vigon – design, painting
- Mark Hanauer – photography
- Cecil Parker – stylist
- Tara Posey – make-up
- Earl S. Cole Jr. – management

Technical credits

- Bernie Grundman – mastering at Bernie Grundman Mastering (Hollywood, California)
- Fred Law – engineer (1, 3, 9), mix assistant (1, 3, 5, 6, 8, 9), additional engineer (5, 6, 8)
- Bill Bottrell – mixing (1, 3, 5, 6, 8, 9), special mix production (1)
- John McClain – mixing (1, 9)
- The Lewis Brothers – special mix production (1)
- Kevin Reach – engineer (2, 4, 7), mixing (2, 4, 7)
- Jim Shifflett – mixing (2, 4, 7)
- Rory Young – engineer (6, 8)
- Ray Bardani – additional engineer (1, 3, 5, 9)
- Calvin Harris – additional engineer (1, 3, 9), engineer (5), mixing (5)
- Bino Espinoza – assistant engineer (1, 3, 5, 9)
- Iris Cohen – assistant engineer (1, 3, 5, 9)
- Michael Dotson – assistant engineer (1, 9)
- Elmer Flores – assistant engineer (1)
- Rhys Moody – assistant engineer (1, 3, 5, 6, 8, 9)
- Karen Siegel – assistant engineer (1, 3, 5, 9)
- Marcus Williams – assistant engineer (1, 3, 9)
- Phil Walters – mix assistant (5), additional engineer (6, 8)
- Ralph Sutton – assistant engineer (3, 9)
- Tyrone Williams – assistant engineer (6, 8)

== Certifications ==
Region	Certification	Certified units/sales
United States (RIAA)	Gold	500,000^{^}
^{^} Shipments figures based on certification alone.
