= Love Crazy =

Love Crazy may refer to:

- Love Crazy (1941 film), starring William Powell and Myrna Loy
- Love Crazy (1991 film), a Canadian film
- Love Crazy (Atlantic Starr album), 1991
- Love Crazy (The Miracles album), 1977
