= Brilliance (Atlantic Starr album) =

Studio album by Atlantic Starr
- Released: March 4, 1982
- Recorded: 1981
- Studios: Sigma Sound Studios (Philadelphia, Pennsylvania); Motown/Hitsville U.S.A. (Los Angeles, California); Kendun Recorders (Burbank, California)
- Genre: R&B
- Length: 38:49
- Label: A&M
- Producer: James Anthony Carmichael

Atlantic Starr chronology
Radiant (1981)	Brilliance (1982)	Yours Forever (1983)

Singles from Brilliance
- 1. "Circles" Released: 1982

Brilliance is the fourth studio album by Atlantic Starr, released in March 1982 on A&M Records. This album peaked at No. 1 on the US Billboard Top Soul Albums chart and No. 18 on the US Top LPs and Tape chart.

== Background ==
This album featured hit singles "Love Me Down" and "Circles". The album also contained the Sam Dees composition "Your Love Finally Ran Out", which was previously recorded by their then labelmate Les McCann under the title "So Your Love Finally Ran Out For Me" on his 1979 album Tall, Dark & Handsome.

== Critical reception ==
Professional ratings
Review scores
Source	Rating
AllMusic	4/5 stars

AllMusic's Alex Henderson remarked, "Released in 1982, Brilliance was the second of three albums that Carmichael produced for Atlantic Starr -- and it is also one of the band's finest and most essential releases. There is nothing not to like about this LP."

== Track listing ==
1. "Love Me Down" (David Lewis, Wayne Lewis) - 4:50
2. "Sexy Dancer" (David Lewis, Wayne Lewis) - 4:51
3. "Love Moves" (Wayne Lewis) - 5:00
4. "Your Love Finally Ran Out" (Sam Dees) - 4:47
5. "Circles" (David Lewis, Wayne Lewis) - 4:52
6. "Let's Get Closer" (Harold Johnson) - 5:23
7. "Perfect Love" (Greg Phillinganes, Allee Willis) - 4:39
8. "You're the One" (David Cochrane, Deborah Thomas) - 4:12

== Personnel ==
Atlantic Starr

- Sharon Bryant – vocals, lead vocals (1, 5, 8)
- Wayne Lewis – keyboards, vocals, lead vocals (2–4)
- David Lewis – guitars, vocals, lead vocals (6, 7)
- Clifford Archer – bass
- Porter Carroll Jr. – drums, vocals
- Joseph Phillips – percussion
- Koran Daniels – saxophones
- Jonathan Lewis – trombone
- William Sudderth III – trumpet

Additional musicians

- Greg Phillinganes – Fender Rhodes (7), Minimoog bass (7)
- David Cochrane – guitars
- Damon Rentie – tenor saxophone
- Duke Jones – trumpet, flugelhorn

Music arrangements

- James Anthony Carmichael
- David Lewis (1, 2, 5)
- Wayne Lewis (1–3, 5)
- Atlantic Starr (4, 6–8)

=== Production ===
- James Anthony Carmichael – producer
- Calvin Harris – engineer, mixing
- Jane Clark – additional engineer
- Dan Bates – assistant engineer
- John Convertino – assistant engineer
- Fred Law – assistant engineer
- Bernie Grundman – mastering at A&M Studios (Hollywood, California)
- Chuck Beeson – art direction
- Lynn Robb – design
- Diem Jones – front cover photography
- Michelle Armitage – front cover photo assistant
- Mike Shaw – back cover photography
- Rod Taylor – sleeve photography
- Rick Merlin for Ion Drive – lasers
- Robertina Hoyt – costumes
- Tara Posey – make-up
- Earl Cole – management

== Charts ==
=== Weekly charts ===
Chart (1982)	Peak position
US Billboard Top LPs and Tape	18
US Billboard Top Soul Albums	1

=== Year-end charts ===
Chart (1982)	Position
US Top R&B/Hip-Hop Albums (Billboard)	7
