= Ventola =

Ventola is a surname. Notable people with the surname include:

- Cristian Ventola (born 1997), Italian footballer
- Danilo Giacinto Ventola (born 2000), Italian footballer
- Gia Ventola, American fashion designer
- Nicola Ventola (born 1978), Italian footballer
