= Yours Forever =

Yours Forever may refer to:

- Yours Forever (Atlantic Starr album), 1983
- Yours Forever (Jessica Mauboy album), 2024
- Yours Forever, a 2012 song by Dara Maclean
