= We're Movin' Up =

Studio album by Atlantic Starr
- Released: 1989
- Studios: Minot Sound (White Plains, New York); Ocean Way (Hollywood, California); The Sandbox (Easton, Connecticut)
- Genre: Pop
- Length: 51:06
- Label: Warner Bros.
- Producers: David Lewis, Wayne Lewis

Atlantic Starr chronology
All in the Name of Love (1987)	We're Movin' Up (1989)	Love Crazy (1991)

We're Movin' Up is an album by the American band Atlantic Starr, released in 1989. The band supported the album with a North American tour that included a stint with Surface. The album peaked at No. 125 on the Billboard Top Pop Albums. "My First Love" and "My Sugar" were hits on the Black Singles Chart.

== Production ==
The album was produced by brothers and bandmembers David Lewis and Wayne Lewis. Singer Porsha Martin replaced Barbara Weathers; Jonathan Lewis joined on keyboards. "My First Love" includes a spoken intro by Wayne Lewis.

== Critical reception ==
Professional ratings
Review scores
Source	Rating
AllMusic	3/5 stars
The Encyclopedia of Popular Music	3/5 stars
Los Angeles Times	3/5 stars

The Los Angeles Times stated: "Continuing to move in a pop direction, Atlantic Starr can attribute its success to well-crafted songs and its crafty selection of stand-out female group members to help embellish them." The Washington Post opined that "on the title song from its new album, We're Movin' Up, Atlantic Starr sings the chorus with the bland perkiness of anonymous jingle singers in a beer commercial."

The Palm Beach Post determined that We're Movin' Up "features some noteworthy songs from the seasoned professionals, but the album is ultimately bogged down by super-glossy, sound-alike ballads." The Buffalo News concluded that "tracks like the title cut and 'Don't Start the Fire' are filled with the driving rhythms that fans have come to expect."

AllMusic's Ron Wynn also noted "Prototype classy love ballads, dance-pop, urban contemporary production/arrangements, and one or two above-average leads. Atlantic Starr has shuttled personnel often but never tampered much with its basic formula. The group does it well, and there's little here that's disturbing, poorly performed, or routinely performed."

== Track listing ==
All tracks are written by David Lewis and Wayne Lewis, except where noted.

No.	Title	Writer(s)	Length
1.	"Under Your Spell"		4:29
2.	"Bring It Back Home Again"	Jonathan Lewis, Jeff Prusan	4:11
3.	"I'm in Love with You"		4:27
4.	"Don't Start the Fire"	Rich Aronson, David Brian Oliver, Joseph Phillips	3:58
5.	"Love Ain't Fair"		5:02
6.	"My First Love"		5:07
7.	"Woman's Touch"	Richard Feldman, Jimmy Scott	3:59
8.	"Friends"		4:11
9.	"We're Movin' Up"		4:05
10.	"My Sugar"	Danny Howard, Prusan	3:50
11.	"I Can't Wait"		4:00
12.	"You Deserve the Best"	Lewis Anderson, J.D. Martin	3:37

== Personnel ==
Atlantic Starr

- Wayne Lewis – vocals, backing vocals, keyboards, music programming and performance, lead vocals (1, 3, 5, 6, 8, 9, 12)
- Jonathan Lewis – keyboards, music programming
- David Lewis – vocals, backing vocals, keyboards, guitars, additional music programming and performance, lead vocals (2, 7-11)
- Joseph Phillips – percussion
- Porscha Martin – vocals, backing vocals, lead vocals (3, 4, 8, 9, 11)

Additional musicians

- Rich Aronson – keyboard sweetening
- Dave Dunn – keyboards, bass synthesizer programming, drum programming
- Rodney Frazier – keyboards
- Danny Howard – keyboards, bass synthesizer programming, drum programming
- Andy Bloch – guitars, electric sitar, guitar solo (5, 11)
- Mike "Dino" Campbell – guitars, guitar solo (3)
- Paul Jackson Jr. – guitars, electric sitar, guitar solo (8)
- Richard Feldman – bass synthesizer programming
- Dave Phillips – bass synthesizer programming, drum programming
- Ron Skies – bass synthesizer programming
- Paulinho da Costa – percussion
- V. Jeffrey Smith – saxophone solo (7)
- Gerald Albright – saxophone solo (11, 12)
- Audrey Wheeler – backing vocals

Music arrangements

- David Lewis – arrangements, horn arrangements (9, 11)
- Wayne Lewis – arrangements
- Gene Page – horn and string arrangements, co-horn arrangements (9, 11)

Production

- David Lewis – producer
- Wayne Lewis – producer
- Jonathan Lewis – associate producer
- Earl Cohen – engineer, mixing
- Iris Cohen – additional engineer, assistant engineer
- Fred Law – additional engineer
- John Wise – additional engineer, assistant engineer
- Ronald Blackwell – assistant engineer
- Mike Harlow – assistant engineer
- Michael Russo – assistant engineer
- Jim Singer – assistant engineer
- Ted Jensen – mastering at Sterling Sound (New York City, New York)
- Janet Levinson – art direction, design
- Alan Dockery – photography
- Gloria Armond – stylist
- Deborah Howell – make-up
- Toni Greene – hair
- Chiaki Shimada – hair
- Linea Dome by Jay Ko – fashions

== Charts ==
Chart (1989)	Peak position
Billboard Top Pop Albums	125
Billboard Top Black Albums	26
