= List of Hot Adult Contemporary number ones of 1987 =

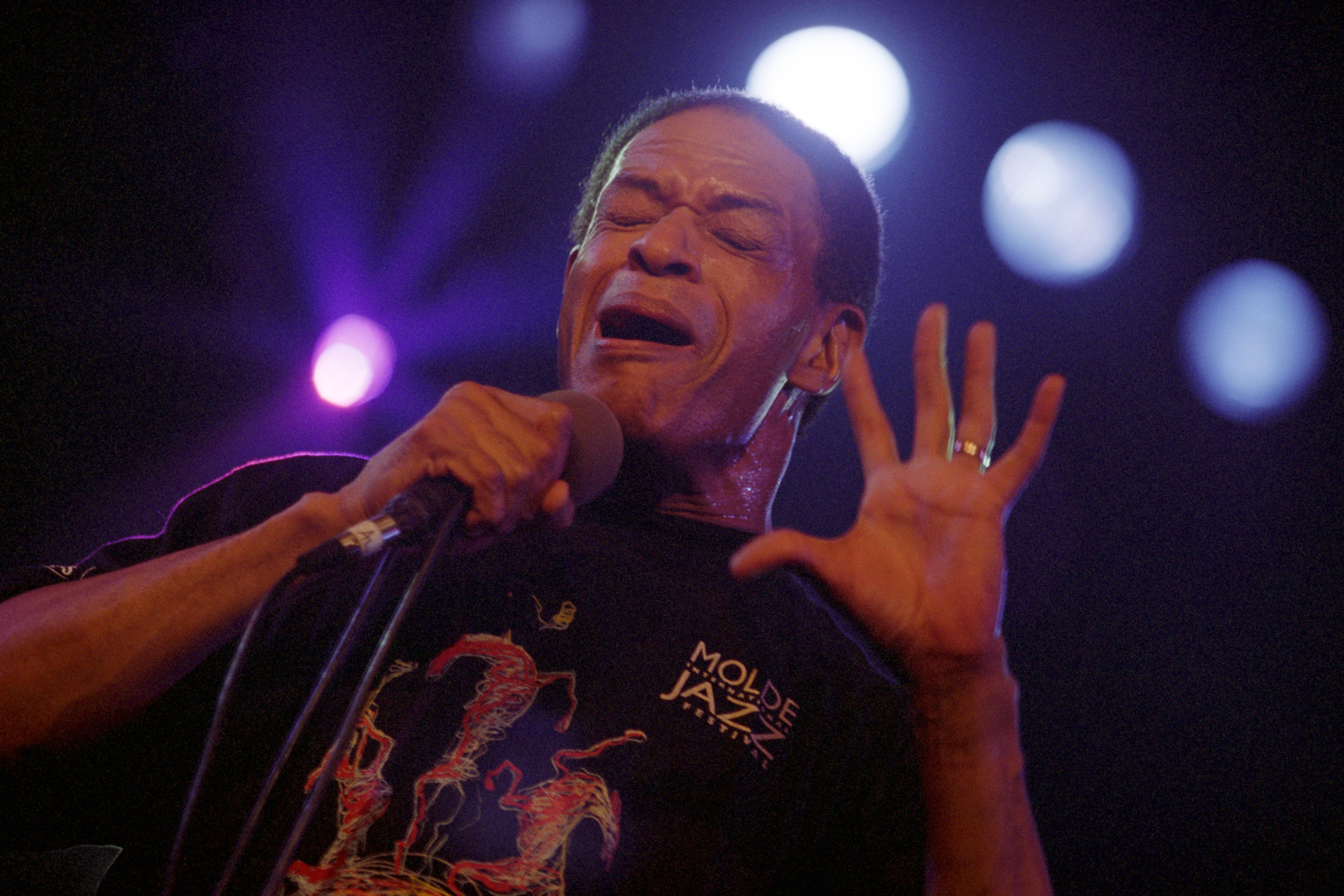
Al Jarreau topped the chart with "Moonlighting", the theme song from the TV show of the same name.

In 1987, Billboard magazine published a chart ranking the top-performing songs in the United States in the adult contemporary music (AC) market. The chart, which in 1987 was published under the title Hot Adult Contemporary, has undergone various name changes during its history but has been published as Adult Contemporary since 1996. In 1987, 22 songs topped the chart based on playlists submitted by radio stations.

In the year's first issue of Billboard the number one song was "Love Is Forever" by Billy Ocean, which was in its third week at number one. It held the top spot for a single week in 1987 before being replaced by "This Is the Time" by Billy Joel. The third chart-topper of the year, "At This Moment" by Billy Vera and the Beaters, had originally been released in 1981 but met with little success. Several years later, however, it was used in the NBC sitcom Family Ties to soundtrack the romance between Alex P. Keaton and his girlfriend Ellen Reed, after which it was re-released and went to number one on both the AC chart and Billboard's pop singles listing, the Hot 100. A second song to top the AC chart in 1987 based on exposure on television was "Moonlighting", the theme song from the comedy-drama of the same name which aired on ABC. Performed by Al Jarreau, the song topped the chart for a single week in July. Two songs featured in films also topped the chart in 1987: "Nothing's Gonna Stop Us Now" by Starship from the soundtrack of Mannequin, and "(I've Had) The Time of My Life" by Bill Medley and Jennifer Warnes from Dirty Dancing.

"(I've Had) The Time of My Life" was one of three songs to tie for the longest unbroken run at number one during the year with four weeks in the top spot, along with "Ballerina Girl" by Lionel Richie and "Little Lies" by Fleetwood Mac. Only two acts achieved more than one AC number one in 1987. Whitney Houston topped the chart with "I Wanna Dance with Somebody (Who Loves Me)" in July and "Didn't We Almost Have It All" in September, and Steve Winwood reached number one with "The Finer Things" in April and "Back in the High Life Again" in August. All four songs spent three weeks at number one, and Houston and Winwood tied for the highest total number of weeks at number one by an act in 1987 with six apiece. The final AC number one of the year was "Got My Mind Set on You" by George Harrison, which also topped the Hot 100 but would prove to be the final song by the former member of the Beatles to reach the peak position on either chart before his death in 2001. The number one position on Billboard's Year-End AC chart for 1987 was held by "Can't We Try" by Dan Hill and Vonda Shepard, even though it failed to reach the top spot in the weekly charts during the year.

== Chart history ==
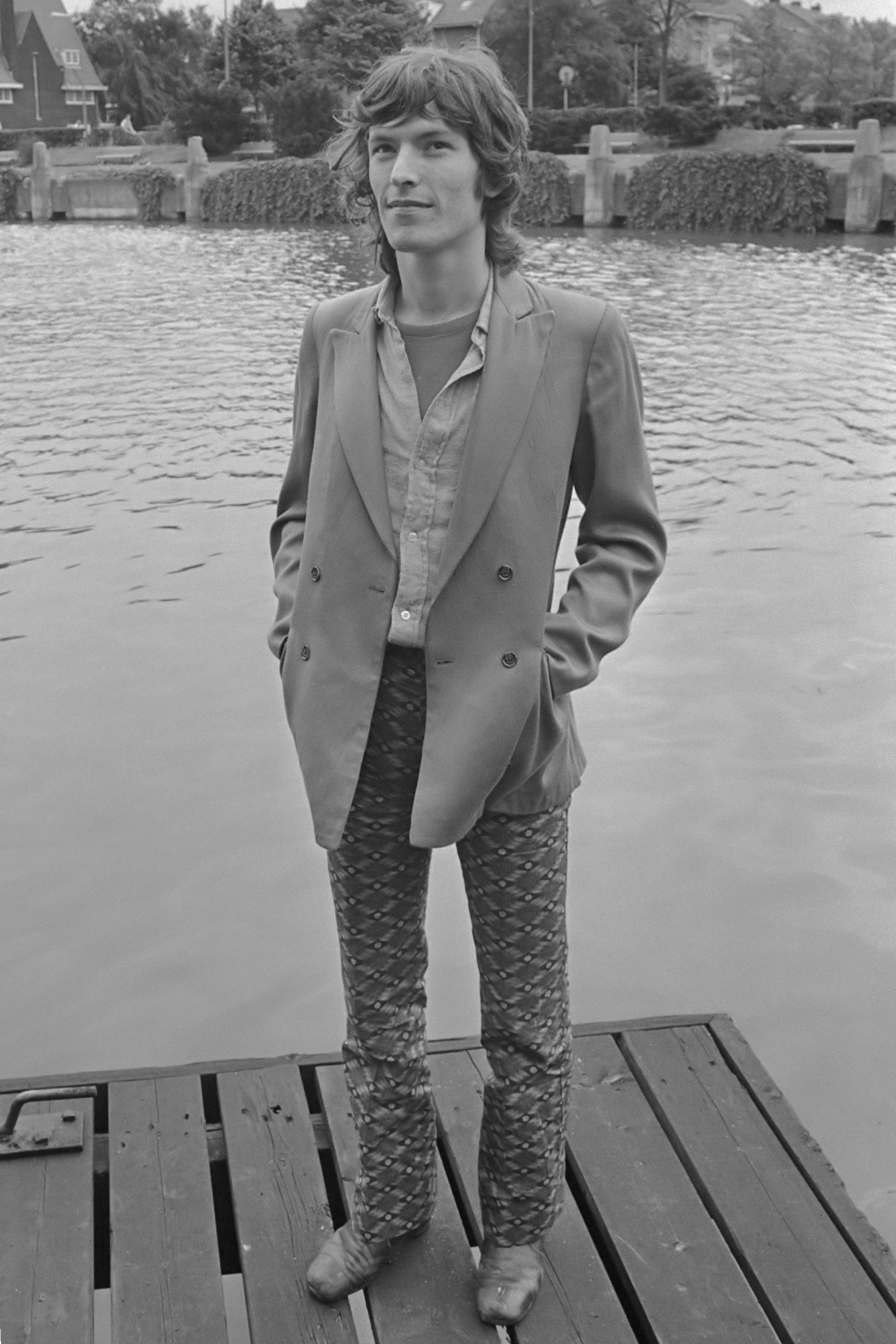
The British singer Steve Winwood (pictured in 1970) had two number ones in 1987.

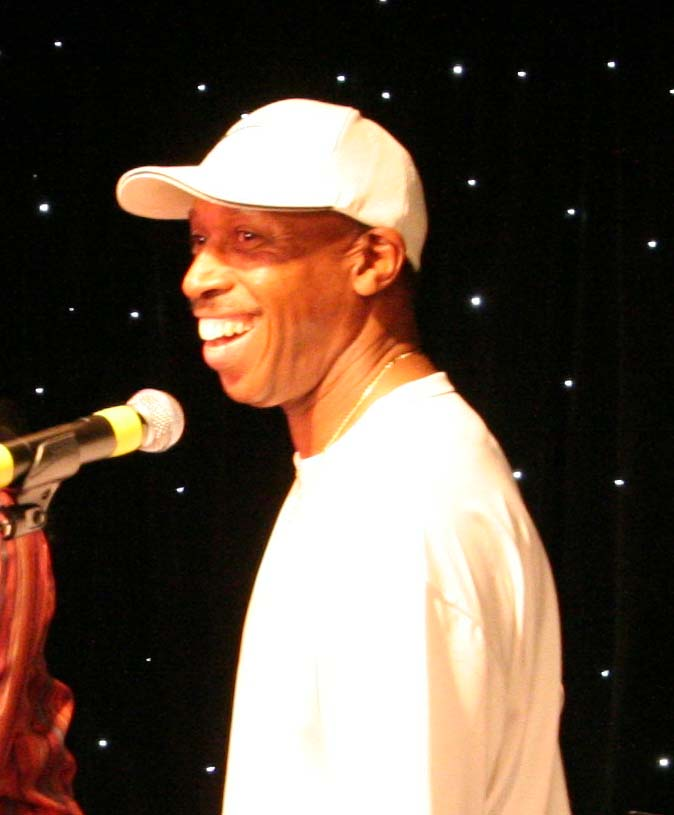
Jeffrey Osborne collaborated with Dionne Warwick on the chart-topper "Love Power".

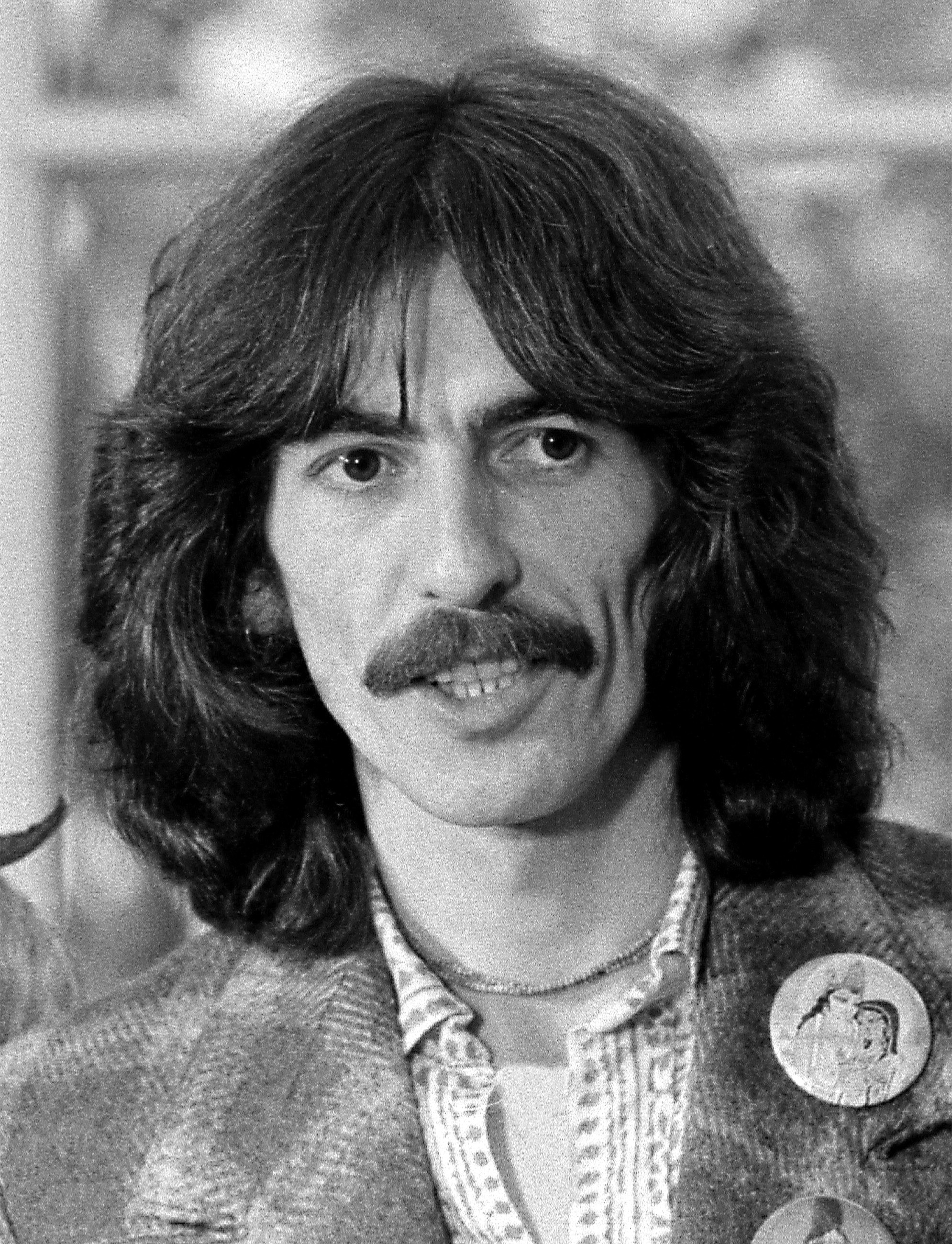
George Harrison ended the year at number one.

Chart history
Issue date	Title	Artist(s)	Ref.
January 3	"Love Is Forever"	Billy Ocean	
January 10	"This Is the Time"	Billy Joel	
January 17	"This Is the Time"	Billy Joel	
January 24	"This Is the Time"	Billy Joel	
January 31	"At This Moment"	Billy Vera and the Beaters	
February 7	"Ballerina Girl"	Lionel Richie	
February 14	"Ballerina Girl"	Lionel Richie	
February 21	"Ballerina Girl"	Lionel Richie	
February 28	"Ballerina Girl"	Lionel Richie	
March 7	"You Got It All"	The Jets	
March 14	"You Got It All"	The Jets	
March 21	"Mandolin Rain"	Bruce Hornsby and the Range	
March 28	"Mandolin Rain"	Bruce Hornsby and the Range	
April 4	"Mandolin Rain"	Bruce Hornsby and the Range	
April 11	"Nothing's Gonna Stop Us Now"	Starship	
April 18	"Nothing's Gonna Stop Us Now"	Starship	
April 25	"The Finer Things"	Steve Winwood	
May 2	"The Finer Things"	Steve Winwood	
May 9	"The Finer Things"	Steve Winwood	
May 16	"Just to See Her"	Smokey Robinson	
May 23	"La Isla Bonita"	Madonna	
May 30	"Always"	Atlantic Starr	
June 6	"Always"	Atlantic Starr	
June 13	"In Too Deep"	Genesis	
June 20	"In Too Deep"	Genesis	
June 27	"In Too Deep"	Genesis	
July 4	"I Wanna Dance with Somebody (Who Loves Me)"	Whitney Houston	
July 11	"I Wanna Dance with Somebody (Who Loves Me)"	Whitney Houston	
July 18	"I Wanna Dance with Somebody (Who Loves Me)"	Whitney Houston	
July 25	"Moonlighting"	Al Jarreau	
August 1	"Back in the High Life Again"	Steve Winwood	
August 8	"Back in the High Life Again"	Steve Winwood	
August 15	"Back in the High Life Again"	Steve Winwood	
August 22	"Love Power"	Dionne Warwick and Jeffrey Osborne	
August 29	"I Just Can't Stop Loving You"	Michael Jackson and Siedah Garrett	
September 5	"I Just Can't Stop Loving You"	Michael Jackson and Siedah Garrett	
September 12	"I Just Can't Stop Loving You"	Michael Jackson and Siedah Garrett	
September 19	"Didn't We Almost Have It All"	Whitney Houston	
September 26	"Didn't We Almost Have It All"	Whitney Houston	
October 3	"Didn't We Almost Have It All"	Whitney Houston	
October 10	"Little Lies"	Fleetwood Mac	
October 17	"Little Lies"	Fleetwood Mac	
October 24	"Little Lies"	Fleetwood Mac	
October 31	"Little Lies"	Fleetwood Mac	
November 7	"Breakout"	Swing Out Sister	
November 14	"Breakout"	Swing Out Sister	
November 21	"(I've Had) The Time of My Life"	Bill Medley and Jennifer Warnes	
November 28	"(I've Had) The Time of My Life"	Bill Medley and Jennifer Warnes	
December 5	"(I've Had) The Time of My Life"	Bill Medley and Jennifer Warnes	
December 12	"(I've Had) The Time of My Life"	Bill Medley and Jennifer Warnes	
December 19	"Got My Mind Set on You"	George Harrison	
December 26	"Got My Mind Set on You"	George Harrison	
