= Barbara Weathers (album) =

Studio album by Barbara Weathers
- Released: 1990
- Studios: Aire L.A. Studios (Glendale, California); Lion Share Studios and Ignited Production (Los Angeles, California); Minot Sound (White Plains, New York); Acme Recording Studios (Mamaroneck, New York); Marathon Studios (New York City, New York); The Lab (West Orange, New Jersey); The Sandbox Studio (Easton, Connecticut)
- Genres: R&B; Soul
- Length: 39:22
- Label: Reprise
- Producers: David Conley; Derrick Culler; Wayne Lewis; Bill Meyers; Rex Salas; Maurice White

Barbara Weathers chronology
Barbara Weathers (1990)	Seeing for the Very First Time (1995)

Barbara Weathers is the debut album by R&B singer Barbara Weathers, released through Reprise Records in 1990. This album got to No. 18 on the UK Blues & Soul Hiplist chart.

== Overview ==
The album was produced by Wayne Lewis, Maurice White and David Conley.

== Singles ==
A song from the album called "The Master Key", rose to No. 13 on the US Billboard Hot R&B Singles chart. Another single entitled "Our Love Will Last Forever" reached No. 39 on the Cashbox Top R&B Singles chart.

== Critical reception ==
Professional ratings
Review scores
Source	Rating
AllMusic	3/5 stars

The album received critical acclaim. Music & Media said: "Transatlantic formula funk. A big, squeaky clean production, some decent songs and a good voice add up to the arrival of yet another crooner. The music has none of the bite of Chaka Khan but what it does have is a singer of charm and variety in Weathers". Phyl Garland of Stereo Review opined, "On the whole, a promising debut." Leonard Pitts Jr. of LA Weekly wrote that "it's a solid piece of pop craftsmanship bright and spunky and then, when you least expect it moving and poignant (just don't look for deep reflection). Barbara Weathers is pop with few illusions and fewer pretensions; it serves up sunny, unobtrusive production alongside lyrics that manage the neat trick of sounding familiar without wallowing in cliche."

Carl Allen of The Buffalo News wrote: "On her first, solo recording she demonstrates that she can produce the catchy and rhythmical pop, as in 'Barbi Doll' or romance laced ballads, as in 'Our Love Will Last Forever'". Lynn Dean Ford of The Indianapolis Star found that "midtempo summer-flavored black pop dominates the nine-track disc". People noted that "Weathers, the former singer for Atlantic Starr, strikes out on her own with an attractive and smooth collection of adult soul music that brings to mind the apex of the S.O.S. Band." They also added, "Never flashy, Weathers’s voice is graciously dignified. The whole album is like that: lively without being overwhelming, pretty without being precious. If you’re having an afternoon party in the backyard, this would be an ideal tape to slip in the boom-box."

== Track listing ==
No.	Title	Writer(s)	Length
1.	"Barbi Doll"	Barbara Weathers, Eugene "Chuckii" Booker, Rex Salas	4:49
2.	"Our Love Will Last Forever"	Ray Flippen, Rodney Frazier	4:08
3.	"My Only Love"	Bill Meyers, Maurice White, Sheldon Reynolds	4:13
4.	"Where Can You Run"	Michael Bolton, Randy Goodrum	3:28
5.	"The Master Key"	Bobby Wooten, David "Pic" Conley, Everett Collins	4:18
6.	"Where Did Our Love Go"	Holland-Dozier-Holland	5:17
7.	"All I Know"	Wayne Lewis	3:37
8.	"Anywhere"	Bill Meyers, Diane Quander, Maurice White	4:15
9.	"Our Love Runs Deep"	Wayne Lewis	4:58

== Personnel ==
- Barbara Weathers – lead vocals, backing vocals (1, 3, 5, 6, 8)
- Rex Salas – keyboards (1)
- Rodney Frazier – keyboards (2, 4)
- Steve Cullo – keyboard programming (2, 4, 7, 9), drum programming (2, 4, 7, 9)
- Ron Skies – additional keyboard programming (2, 4), additional drum programming (2, 4)
- Bill Meyers – keyboards (3, 6, 8), synthesizers (3, 6, 8), synthesizer sequencing (3), drum sequencing (3), synthesizer programming (6, 8), drum programming (8)
- Jeff Rona – synthesizer programming (3, 8)
- Wayne Lewis – keyboards (4, 7), additional drum programming (4), backing vocals (7, 9), additional instruments (7), all instruments (9)
- Rich Aronson – synthesizer strings (4, 7)
- Everett Collins– keyboards (5)
- David "Pic" Conley – keyboards (5)
- Bobby Wooten – keyboards (5)
- Thomas Organ – guitars (1)
- Andy Bloch – guitars (2, 4, 7)
- Sheldon Reynolds – guitars (3, 6, 8), backing vocals (3, 6)
- David Townsend – guitars (5)
- Chuckii Booker – bass synthesizer (1)
- Ray Flippin – bass synthesizer (2), bass (4)
- Derek Organ – drums (1)
- Maurice White – percussion (3, 6, 8), backing vocals (3, 6)
- Larry Conley – alto saxophone (5)
- Gerald Albright – tenor saxophone (6), alto saxophone (8)
- Carla Benson – backing vocals (2, 4, 7, 9)
- Derrick Culler – backing vocals (5)

Music arrangements

- Ray Flippin – arrangements (2)
- Rodney Frazier – arrangements (2)
- Bill Meyers – arrangements (3, 6, 8)
- Maurice White – arrangements (3, 6, 8)
- Wayne Lewis – arrangements (4, 7, 9)
- Gene Page – synthesizer string arrangements (4, 7)
- Derrick Culler – vocal arrangements (5)

== Production ==
- Rex Salas – producer (1)
- Wayne Lewis – producer (2, 4, 7, 9)
- Bill Meyers – producer (3, 6, 8)
- Maurice White – producer (3, 6, 8)
- David Conley – producer (5)
- Derrick Culler – producer (5)
- Janet Levinson – art direction, design
- Stephen Danielian – photography
- Toni Greene – hair
- Tara Posey – make-up
- Laura Rice – wardrobe stylist
- Earl S. Cole Jr. – management

Technical credits

- Rob Seifert – recording (1)
- David Koenig – mixing (1), additional recording (1)
- Earl Cohen – recording (2, 4, 7, 9), mixing (9)
- Ray Bardani – mixing (2, 4, 7)
- Paul Klingberg – recording (3, 6, 8), mixing (3, 6, 8)
- David "Pic" Conley – recording (5)
- Bassy Bob Brockmann – mixing (5)
- Fletcher Dobrocke – additional recording (3, 6, 8)
- Gregg Barrett – assistant engineer (1)
- Mike Scotella – assistant engineer (1)
- Iris Cohen – assistant engineer (2, 4)
- Mike Harlow – assistant engineer (2, 4)
- John Wise – assistant engineer (2, 4)
- Guy DeFazio – assistant engineer (3, 6, 8)
- Jeff Welch – assistant engineer (3, 6, 8)
- Dug Larsen – mix assistant (5)

== Covers ==
Weathers covered the Supremes' 1964 hit single "Where Did Our Love Go" on the album.

== Appearances in other media ==
"Where Did Our Love Go" appeared on the soundtrack to the film A Time for Dancing.

== Charts ==
Year	Chart	Peak position
1990	UK Blues & Soul The Hiplist	18
1990	UK Blues & Soul Top UK Soul Albums	37
1990	US Billboard Top R&B/Hip-Hop Albums	79
