= Atlantic Starr (album) =

Studio album by Atlantic Starr
- Released: 1978
- Recorded: February–March 1977
- Studio: Hollywood Sound Recorders (Hollywood); A&M (Hollywood)
- Genre: R&B, soul, disco
- Label: A&M
- Producer: Bobby Eli

Atlantic Starr chronology
Atlantic Starr (1978)	Straight to the Point (1979)

Professional ratings
Review scores
Source	Rating
AllMusic	2.5/5 stars

Atlantic Starr is the self-titled debut album by R&B/funk band Atlantic Starr. Produced by Bobby Eli, founding member and lead guitarist of Philadelphia studio group MFSB. The nine-piece band had an impressive showing on the Billboard R&B charts with "Stand Up", "Keep It Comin'", "(I'll Never Miss) The Love I Never Had" and "With Your Love I Come Alive".

== Track listing ==
All songs written by Bobby Eli and Jeff Prusan; arranged by Bobby Eli, except where noted.

1. "Stand Up" (Wayne Lewis; arranged by Bobby Eli and Atlantic Starr) - 4:29
2. "Keep It Comin'" - 4:35
3. "Visions" - 3:32
4. "Being in Love with You Is So Much Fun" (Wayne Lewis; arranged by Atlantic Starr and Bobby Eli) - 3:57
5. "(I'll Never Miss) The Love I Never Had" - 3:55
6. "Gimme Your Lovin'" - 4:57 (Wayne Lewis; arranged by Bobby Eli and Atlantic Starr)
7. "With Your Love I Come Alive" - 4:20
8. "We Got It Together" - 3:50
9. "Don't Abuse My Love" (Wayne Lewis, Sharon Bryant, Porter Carroll; arranged by Atlantic Starr and Bobby Eli) - 2:56
10. "Where There's Smoke There's Fire" - 4:23

== Personnel ==
Atlantic Starr

- Wayne Lewis – keyboards, backing vocals, lead vocals (1, 6)
- David Lewis – guitars, backing vocals, lead vocals (2, 3, 5, 10)
- Clifford Archer – bass
- Porter Carroll Jr. – drums, backing vocals, lead vocals (3, 7)
- Sharon Bryant – percussion, backing vocals, lead vocals (2, 4, 8, 9)
- Joseph Phillips – percussion, congas, flute
- Damon Rentie – saxophones, flute
- Jonathan Lewis – trombone, percussion
- William Sudderth III – trumpet

Additional musicians

- Bobby Eli – guitars, sitar, percussion
- Steve Mallory – saxophone
- Don Renaldo and The Philly Strings – strings
- Paul Shure – concertmaster

Production

- Bobby Eli – producer
- Bob Hughes – engineer
- Bob Mockler – additional engineer
- Skip Cottrell – assistant engineer
- Pat Flaherty – assistant engineer
- Doug Graves – assistant engineer
- Bob Higgins – assistant engineer
- Steve Katz – assistant engineer
- Ellis Sorkin – assistant engineer
- Bernie Grundman – mastering
- Roland Young – art direction
- Phil Shima – design
- John Hamagami – illustration
- Mark Hanauer – photography

== Charts ==
Year	Album	Chart positions	
Year	Album	US	US R&B
1978	Atlantic Starr	67	21

=== Singles ===
Year	Single	Chart positions		
Year	Single	US	US R&B	US Dance
1978	"Stand Up"	—	16	26
1978	"Keep It Comin'"	—	49	—
