= Touch a Four Leaf Clover =

"Touch A Four Leaf Clover"

Single by Atlantic Starr

from the album Yours Forever
- Released: 1983
- Genre: R&B, soul
- Label: A&M Records
- Songwriter(s): David Lewis, Wayne Lewis
- Producer(s): James Anthony Carmichael

Atlantic Starr singles chronology
"Your Love Finally Ran Out" (1982)	"Touch A Four Leaf Clover" (1983)	"Yours Forever" (1983)

"Touch A Four Leaf Clover" is a song recorded by R&B group Atlantic Starr, released as a single from their 1983 Yours Forever by A&M Records. The song reached No. 4 on the US Billboard Hot R&B Singles chart.

== Overview ==
"Touch a Four Leaf Clover" was produced by James Anthony Carmichael and composed by David Lewis with Wayne Lewis.

== Charts ==
=== Weekly charts ===
Chart (1983)	Peak position
US Billboard Hot 100	87
US Hot R&B/Hip-Hop Songs (Billboard)	4

=== Year-end charts ===
Chart (1984)	Position
US Hot R&B/Hip-Hop Songs (Billboard)	41

== Covers ==
Erykah Badu covered "Touch a Four Leaf Clover" for her 1997 album Baduizm.
