= Secret Lovers =

1985 single by Atlantic Starr

Single by Atlantic Starr

from the album As the Band Turns
- B-side: Thank You (US); When Love Calls (UK)
- Released: 1985 (US); 1986 (UK)
- Recorded: 1984
- Length: 5:30
- Label: A&M
- Songwriters: David Lewis, Wayne Lewis
- Producers: David Lewis, Wayne Lewis

Atlantic Starr singles chronology
"Silver Shadow" (1985)	"Secret Lovers" (1985)	"If Your Heart Isn't in It" (1986)

"Secret Lovers", released in 1985, is the third single from As the Band Turns, the sixth album from American group Atlantic Starr. "Secret Lovers" was Atlantic Starr's true breakthrough hit on the pop charts in both the US and UK, though the group had previously minor pop and R&B hits in both countries. The flip side "When Love Calls" had previously been issued in the US in 1981 as a single (A&M Records AM-8634) and proved a substantial club success in the UK where its presence contributed to sales of "Secret Lovers".

Sung as a duet between Atlantic Starr members Barbara Weathers and David Lewis, "Secret Lovers" is the story of a man and a woman who are having an affair with each other even though they are both married to other people. Although they know their actions are wrong and are forced to keep their relationship secret as a result (hence the title of the song), they love each other too much to let the affair end. They also justify the affair by trying to convince themselves that maybe their spouses have their own "secret lovers" as well.

The music video for "Secret Lovers" was shot without backing from label A&M, which had recently dropped Atlantic Starr on the grounds of lackluster music sales. Barbara Weathers has publicly expressed her disdain for the video.

A new recording of that track has been done by Alexander O'Neal alongside Mica Paris, and was released as the first single from O'Neal's album Alex Loves... in 2008.

Usher sampled the song in 2008 for his hit single "Love in This Club Part II", which features Beyoncé and Lil Wayne.

== Chart positions ==
Chart (1986)	Peak position
Australian (Kent Music Report)	31
Canada (RPM)	1
New Zealand Singles Chart	8
UK Singles Chart	10
US Billboard Hot 100	3
US Billboard Adult Contemporary	1
US Billboard Hot Black Singles	4

Year-end chart (1986)	Rank
US Top Pop Singles (Billboard)	12

== See also ==
- List of number-one adult contemporary singles of 1986 (U.S.)
- List of number-one singles of 1986 (Canada)
