= Yours Forever (Atlantic Starr album) =

Studio album by Atlantic Starr
- Released: October 11, 1983
- Studios: Sigma Sound, New York City; Mediasound, New York City; Minot Sound, White Plains, New York; Hitsville U.S.A., Hollywood; Ocean Way, Hollywood
- Length: 40:35
- Label: A&M
- Producer: James Anthony Carmichael

Atlantic Starr chronology
Brilliance (1982)	Yours Forever (1983)	As The Band Turns (1985)

Professional ratings
Review scores
Source	Rating
AllMusic	2.5/5 stars
The Washington Post	(favourable)

Yours Forever is the fifth studio album by American band Atlantic Starr. This album features the hit single "Touch a Four Leaf Clover." Yours Forever was the last album to feature Sharon Bryant as a lead vocalist before she departed the group to pursue a solo career. This was also the last album to be produced by James Anthony Carmichael, who was responsible for the group's two previous albums.

== Track listing ==
1. "Yours Forever" (David Lewis) - 5:04
2. "Touch a Four Leaf Clover" (David Lewis, Wayne Lewis) - 4:38
3. "More, More, More" (Sam Dees) - 4:42
4. "I Want Your Love" (Jonathan Lewis, Wayne Lewis) - 4:52
5. "Second to None" (Sharon Bryant, Joseph Phillips) - 4:38
6. "Island Dream" (David Lewis, Wayne Lewis) - 4:49
7. "Who Could Love You Better?" (Clifford Archer, Wayne Lewis) - 4:30
8. "More Time for Me" (Maxi Anderson, Nicki Johnson) - 3:42
9. "Tryin'" (Deborah Thomas, David Cochrane) - 3:28

== Personnel ==
Atlantic Starr

- Sharon Bryant – vocals, lead vocals (2, 3, 5, 8, 9)
- Wayne Lewis – keyboards, vocals, lead vocals (3, 4, 7)
- David Lewis – guitars, vocals, lead vocals (1, 6, 8)
- Clifford Archer – bass
- Porter Carroll Jr. – drums, vocals
- Joseph Phillips – percussion
- Koran Daniels – saxophones
- Jonathan Lewis – trombone
- William Suddeth III – trumpet

Additional musicians

- Michael Boddicker – synthesizers
- Greg Phillinganes – synthesizers
- Paulinho da Costa – percussion

Music arrangements

- James Anthony Carmichael
- Wayne Lewis (1, 2, 4, 6, 7)
- David Lewis (1, 2, 4, 6, 7)
- Atlantic Starr (3, 5, 8, 9)

=== Production ===
- James Anthony Carmichael – producer
- Calvin Harris – engineer, mixing
- Fred Law – additional engineer
- Bruce Robbins – assistant engineer
- Ralph Sutton – assistant engineer
- Bernie Grundman – mastering at A&M Studios (Hollywood, California)
- Rita Leigh – production assistant
- Leslie Jean Bart – back cover skyline photography
- Diem Jones – sleeve photography
- Richard Fuggetta – front cover art
- Roderick Taylor – logo impression, sleeve photography assistant
- Carl Davis – formal wear design
- Alfonso Grundy – make-up, styling
- Audrey Smaltz – make-up, styling
- Earl Cole for Cole Classic Management – management

== Charts ==
=== Weekly charts ===
Chart (1983–1984)	Peak position
US Billboard 200	91
US Top R&B/Hip-Hop Albums (Billboard)	10

=== Year-end charts ===
Chart (1984)	Position
US Top R&B/Hip-Hop Albums (Billboard)	25
