= All in the Name of Love =

Studio album by Atlantic Starr
- Released: March 31, 1987
- Recorded: 1986
- Studios: Acme Recording Studios (Mamaroneck, New York); Hitsville U.S.A., Hollywood Sound Recorders and Soundcastle (Hollywood, California); Minot Sound Studios (White Plains, New York)
- Genres: Pop; R&B
- Length: 51:56
- Label: Warner Bros.
- Producers: David Lewis; Wayne Lewis; Jonathan Lewis; Maurice White

Atlantic Starr chronology
Secret Lovers... The Best Of Atlantic Starr (1986)	All in the Name of Love (1987)	We're Movin' Up (1989)

Singles from All in the Name of Love
- 1. "Always" Released: 1987

All in the Name of Love is the seventh studio album by R&B group Atlantic Starr, released in March 1987 by Warner Bros. Records. The album peaked at number 4 on the US Top R&B Albums chart and number 18 on the Billboard 200, and was also certified platinum in the US by the RIAA.

== Critical reception ==
Professional ratings
Review scores
Source	Rating
AllMusic	3/5 stars
Los Angeles Times	2/4 stars
People	(favorable)
The Philadelphia Inquirer	3/4 stars

Ken Tucker of The Philadelphia Inquirer described the album as "a collection of songs that demonstrate Atlantic Starr's skill at creating brisk, funky pop songs." Johnny Loftus of AllMusic wrote, "The album could have used more vocals from the talented Barbara Weathers, but it's still a well-appointed record that offers fans much more than just the Whitney-flavored single."

Robert K. Oermann of USA Today ranked the album at No. 33 on his list of 1987's top 50 R&B albums.

== Track listing ==
- All songs written by David and Wayne Lewis, except where noted.
1. "One Lover at a Time" (Richard Feldman, Jimmy Scott) - 4:00
2. "You Belong with Me" - 4:53
3. "Females" - 3:42
4. "Don't Take Me for Granted" - 5:04
5. "Always" (Jonathan, David and Wayne Lewis) - 4:39
6. "Armed and Dangerous" (Garry Glenn, Martin Page, Maurice White) - 4:08 ++
7. "Let the Sun In" - 4:04
8. "Thankful" - 5:03
9. "I'm in Love" - 4:25 ++
10. "All in the Name of Love" (Sam Dees) - 5:26
11. "My Mistake" - 5:19
12. "Interlude" - 1:13

++ "Armed and Dangerous" and "I'm in Love" only appear on the CD versions of the album

== Personnel ==
Atlantic Starr

- Wayne Lewis – keyboards, vocals, music programming and performance, lead vocals (2, 3, 8, 10)
- Jonathan Lewis – keyboards, music programming and performance
- David Lewis – guitars, vocals, music programming and performance, lead vocals (3, 5–7, 11, 12)
- Joseph Phillips – percussion
- Barbara Weathers – vocals, lead vocals (1, 4, 5, 9, 10)

Additional musicians

- Rich Aronson – keyboard sweetening (1, 4, 10)
- Richard Feldman – rhythm keyboard programming (1), bass (1), drums (1)
- Rhett Lawrence – synthesizers (6), programming (6)
- Fritz Cadet – guitar (2, 3)
- David Cochrane – guitar (2–4), bass (7)
- Andy Bloch – guitar (5, 8, 9)
- Charles Foster Johnson – guitar (6)
- Marlon McClain – guitar (6)
- Danny Atherton – drums (2, 8)
- Paulinho da Costa – percussion (1–4, 7–11)
- Gary Coleman – percussion (10, 11)
- Gerald Albright – saxophone solo (6–8)
- Albert "Duke" Jones Jr. – flugelhorn solo (12)

Music arrangements

- David Lewis – arrangements (1–5, 7–12)
- Wayne Lewis – arrangements (1–5, 7–12)
- Maurice White – arrangements (6)
- Bill Myers – arrangements (6)
- Gene Page – horn and string arrangements, conductor

== Production ==
- David Lewis – producer (1–5, 7–12)
- Wayne Lewis – producer (1–5, 7–12)
- Jonathan Lewis – associate producer (1–5, 7–12)
- Maurice White – producer (6)
- George DuBose – cover design, cover photography
- Mark Weinberg – typography
- Robert Molnar – stylist
- Joyce Lewis – hair stylist
- Joe McDevitt – make-up
- Mano -A- Mano – additional fashions
- Earl Cole – management

Technical credits

- Brian Gardner – mastering at Bernie Grundman Mastering (Hollywood, California)
- Rory Young – engineer (1–5, 7–12)
- Erik Zobler – mixing (1–3, 7, 12)
- Tommy Vicari – mixing (4, 5, 8, 10, 11)
- Tom Perry – engineer (6), mixing (6)
- Ray Bardani – mixing (9)
- Peter Denenberg – additional engineer (1–5, 7–12)
- Bino Espinoza – additional engineer (1–5, 7–12), assistant engineer (1–5, 7–12)
- Fred Law – additional engineer (1–5, 7–12)
- Charles Holman Brown – assistant engineer (1–5, 7–12)
- Liz Cluse – assistant engineer (1–5, 7–12)
- Michael Dotson – assistant engineer (1–5, 7–12)
- Karen Siegel – assistant engineer (1–5, 7–12)
- Ralph Sutton – assistant engineer (1–5, 7–12)

== Certifications ==
Region	Certification	Certified units/sales
United States (RIAA)	Platinum	1,000,000^{^}
^{^} Shipments figures based on certification alone.
