= Barbara Weathers =

American musician

- Born: December 7, 1963 (age 62); Greensboro, North Carolina
- Genres: R&B; pop; soul
- Occupation: Singer
- Instrument: vocals
- Years active: 1978–present
- Labels: Reprise; Weberworks

Barbara Weathers (born December 7, 1963) is an American R&B/soul singer, and former lead singer of R&B vocal group, Atlantic Starr.

== Overview ==
At the age of 13, Weathers joined Covacus, an R&B band from Greensboro, North Carolina. In 1981, she left Covacus and joined "Teaser" a band out of Charlotte N.C.

=== Joining Atlantic Starr ===
After a year with Teaser, she returned to Greensboro and began working as a singing waitress at Yenrofs, a jazz club. There she was approached by two gentlemen from Philadelphia International Records about a solo record deal. Being friends with Wayne Lewis from Atlantic Starr, Barbara called and asked for advice. Wayne then put her in touch with Earl Cole (Atlantic Starr's manager) to help her with the negotiations. Earl acted as her manager on the conference call and afterwards suggested Barbara decline the Philadelphia International's offer and instead allow Wayne and his two brothers (also in Atlantic Starr) to produce a demo for her. Jheryl Busby and MCA funded that demo, which was recorded in December of 1984. The demo included three Lewis brothers-produced songs- "Secret Lovers", "Silver Shadow", and "Big Boy Games". In early January the following year, Barbara received a call from Earl Cole stating MCA had declined her demo, but that there was work for her in L.A.

Two days later, she flew to L.A. Jonathan Lewis picked her up from the airport and took her to a recording studio where Wayne was in the booth singing. When he emerged, Barbara was told to go in the booth and sing what she was told. The song was "If Your Heart Isn't In It". The next day she was informed that Atlantic Starr wanted her to join the group. Stunned, as she had no idea they were looking for a lead female vocalist, and in no way wanted to join another group. She considered declining, but realized it would be a mistake to say no to an established group with a current record deal, so she accepted the offer.

=== Success ===
In 1985, she began recording with Atlantic Starr for their A&M album As the Band Turns, which would include both "Secret Lovers" and "Silver Shadow". As it turned out, Weathers' arrival would herald a new era of mainstream success for the group, with "Secret Lovers" reaching No. 3 on the US Billboard Hot 100 chart (becoming the band's first major Hot 100 hit), No. 1 on the Adult Contemporary Songs chart, and No. 4 on the Billboard Hot R&B Songs chart. The album spun off four additional top-40 singles on the Billboard Hot R&B Songs chart, including two other top tens- the debut single "Freak-A-Ristic", which shot to No. 6, and "If Your Heart Isn't In It", the song Barbara had first performed in the studio with Wayne immediately after arriving in LA, which matched "Secret Lovers"' placement at No. 4. "Silver Shadow", the other song originally on Barbara's demo and the first Atlantic Starr song to feature her as the sole lead vocalist, reached No. 12 on the R&B chart. As the Band Turns was eventually certified Gold in the US by the RIAA.

Meanwhile, Weathers continued contributing to Atlantic Starr's success, singing on the band's 1987 follow-up album All In The Name Of Love. Spearheaded by the single "Always", a chart-topper on the Pop, R&B, and Adult Contemporary charts, this album surpassed its predecessor, earning RIAA Platinum certification in the US. Follow-up singles from the album included another R&B top ten hit, "One Lover at a Time", also featuring Weathers as the sole lead vocalist.

Following the massive popularity of this album, Weathers left the group because of serious internal issues with the band. going on to release her debut solo album in 1990 on Reprise Records. The LP got to No. 18 on the UK Blues & Soul Hiplist chart. Music & Media said "Transatlantic formula funk. A big, squeaky clean production, some decent songs and a good voice add up to the arrival of yet another crooner. The music has none of the bite of Chaka Khan but what it does have is a singer of charm and variety in Weathers". Leonard Pitts Jr. of LA Weekly wrote "it's a solid piece of pop craftsmanship bright and spunky and then, when you least expect it moving and poignant (just don't look for deep reflection). Barbara Weathers is pop with few illusions and fewer pretensions; it serves up sunny, unobtrusive production alongside lyrics that manage the neattrick of sounding familiar without wallowing in cliche." While the album was not as successful in America, the album cut "The Master Key" rose to no. 13 upon the US Billboard Hot R&B Singles chart.

She later appeared on Big Daddy Kane's October 1990 LP Taste of Chocolate and Paul Jackson Jr.'s 1993 album A River in the Desert where she performed "If I Go Away". Weathers's 1995 sophomore LP entitled Seeing for the Very First Time, was issued solely in Japan and eventually became a smash hit.

1996 Weathers toured with gospel artist Gary Valenciano. 2003 Weathers toured with jazz saxophonist Kirk Whalum and bassist Wayman Tisdale.

During October 2011, she released Satisfaction Guaranteed, her fifth studio album. In 2015 she participated in (I've Had) The Time of My Life tour, a 15-city European tour for promoter David Gest.

Weathers continues to perform and record.

== Discography ==
=== Albums ===
==== With Atlantic Starr ====
- As the Band Turns (1985)
- All in the Name of Love (1987)

==== Solo ====
- Barbara Weathers (1990)
- Seeing For The Very First Time (Weberworks, 1995) released only in Japan
- Satisfaction Guaranteed (Weberworks, 2011)

=== Singles ===
==== With Atlantic Starr ====
1985

- "Freak-A-Ristic"
- "Cool, Calm, Collected"
- "Silver Shadow"
- "Secret Lovers"

1986

- "If Your Heart Isn't In It"
- "Armed and Dangerous" 1986

1987

- "Always"
- "One Lover at A Time"
- "All in the Name of Love"

1988

- "Thankful"

==== Solo ====
1990

- The Master Key
- Our Love Will Last Forever
- "My Only Love"
