= Always (Atlantic Starr song) =

- UK LP cover art, also used as the US 7-inch cover art

Single by Atlantic Starr

from the album All in the Name of Love
- B-side: "Always" (instrumental 5:38, 12"; 4:45, 7"); "I'm in Love" 4:25, 12" single only)
- Released: May 1987
- Recorded: 1986
- Studio: Acme Recording Studios (Mamaroneck, New York), Mixed at Minot Sound Studios in White Plains, New York
- Genre: R&B; soul; pop
- Length: 4:47 (album/12" version); 3:59 (single version)
- Label: Warner Bros.
- Songwriters: David Lewis; Jonathan Lewis; Wayne Lewis
- Producers: David Lewis; Wayne Lewis

Atlantic Starr singles chronology
"If Your Heart Isn't in It" (1986)	"Always" (1987)	"One Lover at a Time" (1987)

"Always" is a song by American group Atlantic Starr. The track was the second single from the group's seventh studio album All in the Name of Love (1987). The single was the biggest hit for Atlantic Starr; it peaked at number one on both the US Billboard Hot 100 and Billboard Hot Black Singles charts in June 1987, being the band's only number-one song. The song also spent two weeks atop the U.S. adult contemporary chart. In July, it topped the Canadian RPM 100 national singles chart, where it remained for two weeks. The British Phonographic Industry (BPI) certified it silver.

== Music video ==
The official music video was directed by Jane Simpson.

== Charts ==
=== Weekly charts ===
Weekly chart performance for "Always"
Chart (1987)	Peak position
Australia (Kent Music Report)	66
Canada Top Singles (RPM)	1
Canada Adult Contemporary (RPM)	2
New Zealand (Recorded Music NZ)	7
South Africa (Springbook)	6
UK Singles (OCC)	3
US Adult Contemporary (Billboard)	1
US Billboard Hot 100	1
US Hot Black Singles (Billboard)	1
US Cash Box Top 100	1

=== Year-end charts ===
1987 year-end chart performance for "Always"
Chart (1987)	Rank
Canada (RPM)	8
New Zealand (Recorded Music NZ)	47
UK Singles (OCC)	25
US Billboard Hot 100	14
US Adult Contemporary (Billboard)	17
US Cash Box Top 100	7
US Crossover Singles (Billboard)	5

== Certifications ==
Certifications for "Always"
Region	Certification	Certified units/sales
United Kingdom (BPI)	Silver	250,000^{^}
^{^} Shipments figures based on certification alone.

== Cover versions and appearances ==
In 1994, Bobbie Eakes and Jeff Trachta included a cover version of the song on their album Bold and Beautiful Duets.

In 2000, pop act Boyz N Girlz United covered the song on their self-titled debut album.

In 2008, it was covered by Filipina singer-actress Iya Villania as a duet with Jay-R on her album Finally!.

Johnny Mathis recorded the song with Mone't on his album A Night to Remember.

MF Doom sampled "Always" for his song "Dead Bent", from his album Operation: Doomsday.

The song appeared in That's Entertainment in 1987 for the Metro Manila Film Festival premiered in Ultra on December 27, 1987.

The song also appears in Mii the episode In The Love.

The song appeared in 1987 episodes of the daytime soap operas Another World, General Hospital, and Loving as well as 1988 episodes of All My Children and The Young and the Restless. in 1988, Hong Kong singer George Lam covered this song in Cantonese.

The song in Cantonese version appears as theme song in 1991 Radio Television Hong Kong (RTHK) Fiction Family 《小說家族》series 12 &13「Hey! Brother」named as 情在破滅時 (Break Up Moment) duet by 甄楚倩 (Yolinda Yan) and 杜德偉 (Alex Tao).

The song was covered during the September 1, 1995 episode of The Bold and The Beautiful by Bobbie Eakes and Jeff Trachta following the wedding of their on-screen characters, Macy Alexander and Thorne Forrester.

The song appears in the game Karaoke Revolution Party, and in the 2011 film, Diary of a Wimpy Kid: Rodrick Rules.

== See also ==
- List of Billboard Hot 100 number ones of 1987
- List of Hot Adult Contemporary number ones of 1987
- List of Hot Black Singles number ones of 1987
