= Masterpiece (Atlantic Starr song) =

1992 single by Atlantic Starr

Single by Atlantic Starr

from the album Love Crazy
- B-side: "Bring It Back Home Again"
- Released: January 8, 1992
- Recorded: 1991
- Genre: R&B; pop
- Length: 4:20 (Edit Version); 4:55 (Album Version)
- Label: Reprise
- Songwriter: Kenny Nolan
- Producers: David Lewis; Wayne Lewis

Atlantic Starr singles chronology
"Love Crazy" (1991)	"Masterpiece" (1992)	"Unconditional Love" (1992)

Music video
- "Masterpiece" on YouTube

"Masterpiece" is a song written by Kenny Nolan and performed by American R&B band Atlantic Starr. It was released in January 1992, by Reprise Records, as the second single from their ninth album, Love Crazy (1991), and peaked at number three on the US Billboard Hot R&B Singles chart. "Masterpiece" also went to number three on both the Billboard Hot 100 and Cash Box Top 100, and number two on the Billboard Hot Adult Contemporary chart. The song performed well in Canada, peaking at number 15 on the RPM Top Singles chart and number one on the RPM Adult Contemporary chart. Nolan has stated that "Masterpiece" is his favorite of all of his compositions, whether among his own hits or those of others.

== Charts ==
=== Weekly charts ===
Chart (1992)	Peak position
Canada Top Singles (RPM)	15
Canada Adult Contemporary (RPM)	1
US Billboard Hot 100	3
US Adult Contemporary (Billboard)	2
US Hot R&B/Hip-Hop Songs (Billboard)	3
US Cash Box Top 100	3

=== Year-end charts ===
Chart (1992)	Position
Canada Adult Contemporary (RPM)	28
US Billboard Hot 100	27
US Adult Contemporary (Billboard)	14
US Hot R&B/Hip-Hop Songs (Billboard)	55
US Cash Box Top 100	20

=== Other Language Versions ===
Cantonese lyrics were substituted in the song 妳是我的太陽 sung by Hacken Lee. The song was used as the sub theme of the Hong Kong TVB Television Series "他來自天堂" (Angel's Call).

== Certifications ==
Region	Certification	Certified units/sales
United States (RIAA)	Gold	500,000^{^}
^{^} Shipments figures based on certification alone.
