= Boyz N Girlz United =

US musical group

- Genre: Pop
- Years active: 1999–2001
- Label: Wire Records
- Past members: Robbie Carrico; Daniel Dix; Rina Mayo; Criss Ruiz

Boyz N Girlz United, also known as Boyz n Girlz, was an American pop group consisting of four members, Robbie Carrico (born November 13, 1981), Daniel Dix (b. May 11, 1980), Rina Mayo (b. April 25, 1981) and Criss Ruiz (b. April 15, 1979). The group was signed to NSYNC manager Johnny Wright's record label, Wire Records, in 1999.

== Overview ==
Boyz N Girlz United had a minor hit in 2000 with "Messed Around", written by *NSYNC member JC Chasez. The single peaked at No. 82 on the UK Singles Chart. They also released their self-titled, full-length album that same year, with music videos choreographed by Keith Junior. From 1999 to 2001, they opened for Britney Spears' …Baby One More Time Tour in the U.S. and her Oops!… I Did It Again World Tour in Europe and *NSYNC’s No Strings Attached Tour in the U.S.; the group also performed during Loreal’s Summer Music Mania and toured with Nickelodeon’s All That Music and More Festival, both in summer 1999. The same year, they co-headlined the Generation WB Concert at the Wichita River Festival in Wichita, Kansas, along with Irish band Mytown. However, by the end of the year, the group disbanded. Carrico was also a member of the short-lived boy band trio, B-Factor in 2001.

Former member Robbie Carrico auditioned for season 7 of American Idol and made it to the top 20 before being eliminated. During his time in the competition, Simon Cowell questioned Carrico's authenticity as a rock singer. Responding to the comments, Carrico said that both his passion for rock n' roll, and his hair, are completely real. He said that claims he was wearing a wig during the competition were ridiculous.

== Discography ==
=== Albums ===
- Boyz-N-Girlz United (released June 20, 2000)

=== Singles ===
- "Messed Around" (June 21, 2000)
- "That's What You Get" (1999)
