= Time (Atlantic Starr album) =

Studio album by Atlantic Starr
- Released: 1994
- Recorded: 1992–1993
- Studios: Devonshire and Palm Tree (North Hollywood, California); Winsonic (West Hollywood, California); Banana Boat, Encore, and The Enterprise (Burbank, California); Music Production (Glendale, California); Larrabee West (Santa Monica, California); Clock Work (Mamaroneck, New York)
- Genre: R&B
- Length: 43:31
- Label: Arista
- Producers: David Lewis; Elliot Wolff; Guy Roche; Vassal Benford; Wayne Lewis

Atlantic Starr chronology
Love Crazy (1991)	Time (1994)	All Because of You (1998)

Time is a studio album by the R&B band Atlantic Starr, released in 1994. The first single was "I'll Remember You". "Everybody's Got Summer" peaked at No. 36 on the UK Singles Chart.

== Critical reception ==
Professional ratings
Review scores
Source	Rating
AllMusic	3/5 stars
The Encyclopedia of Popular Music	2/5 stars

The Republican wrote that the group "tries out a few new tricks, most successfully on the rock solid groove of 'Everybody's Got Summer'."

== Track listing ==
1. "I'll Remember You" (Stacey Piersa, Elliot Wolff) - 4:21
2. "Everybody's Got Summer" (Les Pierce, Eugene Record, Sonny Sanders, Nick Trevisick) - 4:32
3. "My Best Friend" (David Lewis, Wayne Lewis) - 4:50
4. "Time" (David Lewis, Wayne Lewis) - 4:49
5. "Baby Be There" (Diane Warren) - 3:49
6. "Let's Just Sneak Around" (David Lewis, Wayne Lewis) - 4:21
7. "So Good to Come Home To" (Diane Warren) - 4:03
8. "Lovin' You All Over Again" (Dorothy Sea Gazeley, Doug Lenier, David Lewis, Jonathan Lewis, Wayne Lewis) - 4:58
9. "Animal Attraction" (Jonathan Lewis, Wayne Lewis) - 4:28
10. "Along the Way" (David Lewis, Jeff Prusan) - 3:20

== Personnel ==
Atlantic Starr

- David Lewis – lead vocals, keyboards, guitars
- Jonathan Lewis – keyboards, backing vocals
- Wayne Lewis – lead vocals, keyboards
- Aisha Tanner – vocals

Vocalists

- David Lewis – lead vocals (1–5, 7, 8, 10), backing vocals (7, 8)
- Kia Anderson – additional backing vocals (1, 2), lead vocals (2, 3), backing vocals (5)
- Dion "Dustee" Mills – rap (2)
- Wayne Lewis – lead vocals (6, 8, 9), backing vocals (6, 8–10)
- Atlantic Starr – backing vocals (1–5)
- Jeff Pescetto – backing vocals (7)
- Aisha Tanner – backing vocals (7)

Musicians

- Elliot Wolff – programming (1), all instruments (1)
- Vassal Benford – programming (2–4), all instruments (2–4)
- Guy Roche – programming (5, 7), all instruments (5, 7)
- David Lewis – keyboards (6, 8–10), programming (6, 8, 10)
- William Zimmerman – keyboards (6)
- Jonathan Lewis – programming (8, 9), keyboards (9), bass programming (9), drum programming (9)
- Wayne Lewis – keyboards (8, 9), programming (9)
- Rich Aronson – keyboards (10), programming (10)
- Josh Sklair – guitars (5, 7)
- Freddie Fox – guitars (6, 9)
- Ray Fuller – guitars (8)
- "Baby Boy" – bass (6), loops (6, 9)
- Khris Kellow – bass (8)

Music arrangements

- Atlantic Starr – vocal arrangements
- Elliot Wolff – arrangements (1)
- Vassal Benford – vocal arrangements (1, 4), arrangements (2–4)
- Gene Page – horn and string arrangements (3, 10)
- Guy Roche – arrangements (5, 7), vocal arrangements (5, 7)
- Diane Warren – vocal arrangements (5, 7)
- Rich Aronson – arrangements (10)
- David Lewis – arrangements (10)

Production

- Clive Davis – executive producer
- Vassal Benford – producer (1–4)
- Elliot Wolff – producer (1)
- Guy Roche – producer (5, 7)
- David Lewis – producer (6, 8–10)
- Wayne Lewis – producer (6, 8–10)
- Jonathan Lewis – associate producer (6, 8–10)
- Susan Mendola – art direction
- Jon Ragel – photography
- Bernard Jacobs – styling
- Enzo Anglieri – hair
- Kate Kawshara – make-up
- Kim Davis – men's grooming
- Anthony Mitchell – men's grooming assistant

Technical credits

- Victor Flores – engineer (1–4), mix engineer (2–4)
- Steve Peck – mix engineer (1)
- Vassal Benford – mix engineer (2–4)
- Mario Luccy – engineer (5, 7)
- Brian Malouf – mix engineer (5)
- Paul Arnold – engineer (6)
- Michael Wells – engineer (6, 8–10)
- Dave Pensado – mix engineer (6, 9)
- Milton Chan – mix engineer (7)
- Jon Gass – mix engineer (8, 10)
- Robert Ore – engineer (9)
- Tina Antoine – assistant engineer (1, 3, 4)
- Fred Kelly – assistant engineer (1)
- Manny Marroquin – assistant engineer (1)
- Moana Suchard – assistant engineer (5, 7)
- Nazeeh Islam – assistant engineer (6, 8–10)
