= Straight to the Point (Atlantic Starr album) =

Studio album by Atlantic Starr
- Released: April 25, 1979
- Recorded: September–December 1978
- Studios: Sigma Sound, Philadelphia, Pennsylvania
- Genres: R&B, soul, funk
- Label: A&M
- Producer: Bobby Eli

Atlantic Starr chronology
Atlantic Starr (1978)	Straight to the Point (1979)	Radiant (1981)

Professional ratings
Review scores
Source	Rating
AllMusic	2.5/5 stars
Smash Hits	5/10
The Virgin Encyclopedia of R&B and Soul	3/5 stars

Straight to the Point is the second studio album by the American band Atlantic Starr, released in 1979. It was produced by Bobby Eli. The band labeled its sound "classy funk."

== Track listing ==
- All songs written by Wayne Lewis, except as noted.
1. "(Let's) Rock & Roll" - 7:30
2. "Kissin' Power" (Bobby Eli, Jeff Prusan) - 6:23
3. "Let the Spirit Move Ya" (Bobby Eli, Jeff Prusan) - 5:08
4. "Straight to the Point" - 4:45
5. "Bullseye" (Bruce Grey, Bobby Eli, Jeff Prusan) - 3:15
6. "What'cha Feel Inside" (Bobby Eli, Jeff Prusan) - 3:39
7. "Fallin' in Love with You" - 3:29
8. "Losin' You" - 5:28

== Personnel ==
Atlantic Starr

- Wayne Lewis – keyboards, backing vocals, lead vocals (1, 2, 4, 5, 6, 8), arrangements (1, 4, 7, 8), horn arrangements (5), vocal arrangements (5)
- David Lewis – guitars, backing vocals, lead vocals (5, 7), vocal arrangements (5)
- Clifford Archer – bass
- Porter Carroll Jr. – drums, backing vocals, lead vocals (3, 5), vocal arrangements (5)
- Sharon Bryant – percussion, backing vocals, lead vocals (1, 2, 3, 5, 8), vocal arrangements (5)
- Joseph Phillips – percussion, congas, flute
- Damon Rentie – saxophones, flute
- Koran Daniels – alto saxophone solo (8) (not listed as an official member at this point)
- Jonathan Lewis – trombone, horn arrangements (6)
- William Sudderth III – trumpet

Additional musicians

- Bobby Eli – guitar (2, 3, 5, 6), arrangements (2, 3, 5, 6), string arrangements (4, 7, 8), horn arrangements (6)
- Don Renaldo and The Philly Strings – strings (4, 7, 8)

Production

- Bobby Eli – producer
- Jim Gallagher – engineer
- Carl Paruolo – engineer, mixing
- Dirk Devlin – additional engineer
- Kenny Present – additional engineer
- Bruce Bluestein – assistant engineer
- Bill Dorman – assistant engineer
- Frank Luria – assistant engineer
- Jeffrey Stewart – assistant engineer
- Bernie Grundman – mastering at A&M Studios (Hollywood, California).
- Chuck Beeson – graphic design
- Roland Young – art direction
- Brian Davis – illustration
- Brian Hagiwara – photography

== Charts ==
Chart (1979)	Peak position
US Top LPs & Tape (Billboard)	142
US Top Soul LPs	65

=== Singles ===
Year	Single	Chart positions
Year	Single	US R&B
1979	"(Let's) Rock & Roll"	46
