= My First Love (Atlantic Starr song) =

1989 single by Atlantic Starr

Single by Atlantic Starr

from the album We're Movin' Up
- Released: 1989
- Genre: R&B, pop, soul
- Length: 5:07
- Label: Warner Bros.
- Songwriter(s): David Lewis
- Producer(s): David Lewis, Wayne Lewis

Atlantic Starr singles chronology
"Thankful" (1988)	"My First Love" (1989)	"My Sugar" (1989)

"My First Love" is a 1989 song by American recording band Atlantic Starr and is from the band's eighth album We're Movin' Up. The single was their second number one on the Billboard's Black Singles chart, in which lead vocals were performed by Porscha Martin and Wayne Lewis. "My First Love" peaked at number one for one week, but it failed to chart on the Hot 100.

== Chart ==
Chart (1989)	Peak position
US Billboard Hot Black Singles	1
