= Silver Shadow (song) =

1985 single by Atlantic Starr

Single by Atlantic Starr

from the album As the Band Turns
- B-side: "Cool, Calm, Collected"
- Released: 1985
- Genre: R&B
- Length: 4:55
- Label: A&M
- Songwriters: David Lewis; Wayne Lewis
- Producers: David Lewis; Wayne Lewis; Jonathan Lewis

Atlantic Starr singles chronology
"Cool, Calm, Collected" (1985)	"Silver Shadow" (1985)	"One Love" (1985)

Audio video
- "Silver Shadow" on YouTube

"Silver Shadow" is a song by American R&B group Atlantic Starr, released as the third single from their successful 1985 album As the Band Turns. Lead vocals were performed by Barbara Weathers.

The song peaked at No. 13 on the US Billboard R&B chart and No. 49 on the dance chart. In the UK, it was released as the first single from the album and charted at No. 41. With the success of "Secret Lovers", the song was re-released in the UK in 1986; however, it only reached No. 98.

== Background ==
"Silver Shadow" was written and produced by Atlantic Starr members David and Wayne Lewis with other member Jonathan Lewis credited as an associate producer. The song was written for the group's sixth studio album, As the Band Turns (1985), their first album since four of the group's original members left and singer Barbara Weathers joined.

"Silver Shadow" is an uptempo song featuring a soft lead vocal from Weathers. The lyrics positively detail fate and dreams.

== Reception ==
Alex Henderson from AllMusic picked the song as a highlight on As the Band Turns, calling it "excellent" and "dreamy". Andrew Hamilton of the same publication characterized it as a "surrealistic up-tempo number with an eerie softness and Energizer bunny intensity". Tim Roets of the Milwaukee Journal Sentinel viewed Weathers' as "the centrepiece", deeming her delivery "icy but soulful" and "a breathtaking example of pop singing". In his review of the album, Carl Matthews of the Baltimore Afro-American said "Silver Shadow" along with "Thank You" comprised the group's "more familiar standard pop sound". Ralph Kiesel, writer for The Blade highlighted it as a "percolating [...] dance hit". In a less enthusiastic review, Mark Moses of The Boston Phoenix wrote: "'Silver Shadow' has a pleasing soft vocal from Barbara Weathers, a peppy melody, and little else."

Rapper DMX's career was influenced by "Silver Shadow"; in an interview for Rolling Stone he explained: "I'd just finished doing a robbery, and I was walking into my building [...]. I stopped right in my tracks. If you hear the words to that song, you'd know how it predicted my life to me. I'd been doin' the beatbox before that, but that's when I started writin' seriously."

== Formats and track listings ==
- US 7" single
1. "Silver Shadow" – 4:06
2. "Silver Shadow" (Specially Remixed Version) – 4:30
- US 12" single (Specially Remixed Version)
1. "Silver Shadow" (Specially Remixed Version) – 6:55
2. "Silver Version" (Dub Version) – 5:13
- UK 7" single
1. "Silver Shadow" – 4:55
2. "Cool, Calm, Collected" – 4:02
- UK 12" single
1. "Silver Shadow" – 4:55
2. "Cool, Calm, Collected" (US Club Mix) – 6:28
- UK 12" single (Specially Remixed Version)
1. "Silver Shadow" (Specially Remixed Version) – 6:55
2. "Cool, Calm, Collected" (US Club Mix) – 6:28

== Credits and personnel ==
- David Lewis – writer, producer
- Wayne Lewis – writer, producer
- Jonathan Lewis – associate producer

Credits adapted from the single's liner notes.

== Charts ==
Chart (1985)	Peak position
UK Singles (OCC)	41
US Hot R&B/Hip-Hop Songs (Billboard)	13

== All Saints 1.9.7.5. version ==
"Silver Shadow"

Single by All Saints 1.9.7.5
- Released: August 21, 1994
- Studio: Sarm West and Metamorphosis
- Length: 3:50
- Label: ZTT
- Songwriters: David Lewis; Wayne Lewis
- Producer: Ron Tom

All Saints 1.9.7.5 singles chronology
"Silver Shadow" (1994)	"I Know Where It's At" (1997)

Audio video
- "Silver Shadow" on YouTube

=== Background ===
In 1992, English producer Ron Tom met Melanie Blatt, an aspiring singer who had no singing experience at the time. The pair went on to record 14 or 15 tracks over the space of a year. Tom was running a studio and management company in All Saints Road, Notting Hill, having success managing singer Gabrielle and collaborating with Terence Trent D'Arby, Seal, Level 42 and Curiosity Killed the Cat. He met Shaznay Lewis the following year, another aspiring singer. Tom had also worked with another singer, Simone Rainford, for several years.

Tom, along with Blatt, Lewis and Rainford decided that the three singers should form All Saints 1.9.7.5. Speaking to the Sunday Mirror, Tom recalled: "I'd been working with Simone when she was 14 and she has a million-dollar voice. Melanie had no singing experience but she had a really beautiful voice [...]. Shaznay has a great voice and was really ambitious." As the manager of All Saints 1.9.7.5, Tom began "ploughing money into them because [he] was convinced they would make it." The group were later signed to ZTT Records that year, a label run by producer Trevor Horn and his wife Gill Sinclair.

=== Recording and release ===
Tom invested roughly £50,000 arranging gigs, studio staff and promotion for All Saints 1.9.7.5. He produced "Silver Shadow" as the group's debut single, with additional production by Toby Baker. Tom paid £200 a day for Paul Wright and his assistant Andy Gallimore's engineering of the song. The group recorded "Silver Shadow" at ZTT's Sarm West Studios and Tom's Metamorphosis Studios in Notting Hill. Rainford sang lead vocals.

The group promoted the single by playing at radio roadshows and nightclubs across the UK, including the Hippodrome. The single's cover art was shot at All Saints Road by Tim France and designed by M@ Maitland. "Silver Shadow" was released by ZTT on August 21, 1994, bowing at number 92 on the UK Singles Chart. In a review of the single, The Guardian derided the group as having an out-dated swingbeat style and the song as having an "idiotic number of mixes, encompassing every dance style bar Morris", concluding: "Eternal may rest easy in their Timberlands."

=== Formats and track listings ===
- 12" single
1. "Silver Shadow" (Shadow '94) – 5:07
2. "Silver Shadow" (UK Swing One) – 5:06
3. "Silver Shadow" (Club Sax) – 6:30
4. "Silver Shadow" (Jungle) – 4:45
5. "Silver Shadow" (Underground Mix) – 4:53
6. "Silver Shadow" (Rap Dub) – 4:39
- CD single
1. "Silver Shadow" (7" Edit) – 3:50
2. "Silver Shadow" (UK Swing One) – 5:06
3. "Silver Shadow" (Club Sax) – 6:30
4. "Silver Shadow" (Jungle) – 4:45
5. "Silver Shadow" (Bogle Dub) – 5:10
6. "Silver Shadow" (Rare Groove) – 4:38

=== Credits and personnel ===
- Ron Tom – producer
- Paul Wright – engineer
- Andy Gallimore – engineer assistant
- Toby Baker – additional production and programming
- Tim France – photography
- M@ Maitland – design

Credits adapted from the single's liner notes.

=== Charts ===
Chart (1994)	Peak position
UK Singles (OCC)	92
