= Michael Fredo =

American musician

Michael Fredo is an American musician. He is the nephew of fashion designer Tommy Hilfiger.

In October 1999, Fredo's single "This Time Around" reached number 21 during its six weeks in the Billboard Hot 100 singles sales chart, while he was opening for Britney Spears on her 1999 ...Baby One More Time Tour.
