= Circles (Atlantic Starr song) =

1982 single by Atlantic Starr

Single by Atlantic Starr

from the album Brilliance
- B-side: "Does It Matter"
- Released: 1982
- Genre: Post-disco; funk-pop
- Length: 6:25 (12" version)
- Label: A&M (2392-S, US); A&M (AMS 8218, UK)
- Songwriters: David Lewis, Wayne Lewis
- Producer: James Anthony Carmichael

Atlantic Starr singles chronology
"When Love Calls" (1981)	"Circles" (1982)	"Love Me Down" (1982)

"Circles" is a song by the American band Atlantic Starr, and the first single released from their 1982 album Brilliance. The single was the most successful for the group thus far, peaking at number two for two weeks on the Soul Singles chart and it also became their first single to hit the Billboard Hot 100, peaking at number 38. "Circles" was also Atlantic Starr's most successful single on the dance charts, peaking at number nine.

== Cover versions ==
- In 1992, British singer Saffron recorded her version, which featured a remix by Frankie Knuckles, which charted at #60 in the UK.
- In 1998, Kimara Lovelace went to number one on the dance play charts with her version of the song, becoming the most successful single of her career.

== Chart positions ==
=== Atlantic Starr ===
Chart (1982)	Peak position
US Billboard Hot 100	38
US Billboard Hot Black Singles	2
US Billboard Hot Dance Club Songs	9

=== Saffron ===
Chart (1993)	Peak position
UK Singles Chart	60

== See also ==
- List of number-one dance singles of 1998 (U.S.)
- List of post-disco artists and songs
