= Love Crazy (Atlantic Starr album) =

Studio album by Atlantic Starr
- Released: October 29, 1991
- Recorded: 1991
- Studios: GTR (Cleveland, Ohio); Music Production Services (Glendale, California); Encore and Elumba (Burbank, California); Café al Denté (Santa Monica, California); Sound Castle Silver Lake, California); Can-Am (Tarzana, California); Larrabee (North Hollywood, California)
- Genre: R&B
- Length: 52:32
- Label: Reprise
- Producers: David Lewis; Wayne Lewis; Danny Sembello; Antonina Armato; Mike "Nice" Chapman; Tomi Trent

Atlantic Starr chronology
We're Movin' Up (1989)	Love Crazy (1991)	Time (1994)

Love Crazy is a studio album by the American R&B group Atlantic Starr, released in 1991. It contained three singles: "Love Crazy" (No. 75 Pop, No. 7 R&B), "Masterpiece" (No. 3 Pop, No. 3 R&B) and "Unconditional Love" (No. 38 R&B). The album reached No. 134 on the Billboard 200 and No. 25 on the R&B charts.

== Production ==
The album was produced by David Lewis and Wayne Lewis. It contains a mix of ballads and dance tracks. Rachel Oliver joined Atlantic Starr on vocals.

== Critical reception ==
Professional ratings
Review scores
Source	Rating
The Buffalo News	2.5/5 stars
Chicago Tribune	2.5/4 stars

The Chicago Tribune wrote that the album "does provide a solid measure of contemporary R&B." The Buffalo News opined that Oliver "fits in well with Starr's versatile style."

== Track listing ==
1. "I Can't Wait" (David Lewis, Wayne Lewis, Mike "Nice" Chapman, Geraldine Sigler, Trent Thomas) - 5:06
2. "If You Knew What's Good for You" (David Lewis, Wayne Lewis, Antonina Armato, Danny Sembello) - 4:37
3. "Love Crazy" (David Lewis, Wayne Lewis) - 4:46
4. "Hold On" (Rich Aronson, Jonathan Lewis, David Brian Oliver) - 4:14
5. "Lookin' for Love Again" (Sam Dees, Wayne Lewis) - 5:01
6. "Come Lover" (Rich Aronson, Dave Dunn, Jonathan Lewis, Wayne Lewis) - 4:39
7. "You Hit the Spot" (David Lewis, Wayne Lewis) - 4:20
8. "Masterpiece" (Kenny Nolan) - 4:55
9. "Girl, Your Love's So Fine" (David Lewis, Wayne Lewis) - 5:15
10. "My Special Lover" (Garry Brown, Wayne Lewis) - 3:56
11. "Unconditional Love" (David Lewis, Wayne Lewis) - 5:53

== Personnel ==
Atlantic Starr

- David Lewis – lead vocals (3, 4, 8, 10, 11), backing vocals (3–5, 8, 10, 11), keyboards (3, 7), musical programming (3, 7–11), bass (3, 7–11), drums (3, 7–11), percussion (3, 4, 7–11), additional programming (4), guitars (5, 8, 9), electric piano (10), strings (10, 11), grand piano (11), synth horns (11), bells (11)
- Wayne Lewis – lead vocals (1, 5, 6, 9), backing vocals (1, 3, 5, 6, 8–11), cymbal fills (3, 11), tom fills (3, 11), keyboards (5, 8), bass (5), drums (5), musical programming (8–10), additional synth strings (8), synth strings (9), grand piano (10), additional strings (10), bells (10)
- Jonathan Lewis – musical programming (3), additional programming (4, 5), percussion (4)
- Rachel Oliver – lead vocals (2, 7, 11), backing vocals (7, 11)

Additional musicians

- Mike "Nice" Chapman – keyboards (1), drum programming (1), musical programming (1)
- Tomi Trent – keyboards (1), musical programming (1)
- Paul Arnold – additional programming (1, 3, 5–7)
- Danny Sembello – keyboards (2), musical programming (2)
- Rich Aronson – strings (2, 9), keyboard sweetening (4, 8), bass (4), drums (4), additional keyboard sweetening (5), keyboards (6), musical programming (6), keyboard effects (9), horns (9), strings (9)
- Sam Dees – electric piano (5)
- Dave Dunn – musical programming (6), keyboards (6), bass (6), drums (6)
- Dean Pleasants – guitars (3, 6, 7)
- Norman Brown – guitars (4, 5, 8)
- David Cochrane – guitars (4)
- Doug Grigsby – bass (2)
- Garry Brown – additional bass fills (10)
- Gimmie Adney – drums (2)
- Frank Briggs – cymbal fills (3, 11), tom fills (3, 11)
- Koran Davis – alto saxophone (4)
- MC Smooth – rap (1)
- Crystal Blake – backing vocals (2)
- Steve Weis – backing vocals (2)

Music arrangements

- Gene Page – horn and string arrangements (3, 5, 8, 11)
- Wayne Lewis – additional synth string arrangements (5)
- Rich Aronson – additional string arrangements (8), horn and string arrangements (9), additional synth string arrangements (11)
- David Lewis – additional synth string arrangements (11)

Production

- Jonathan Lewis – executive producer
- Benny Medina – executive producer
- David Lewis – executive producer, producer
- Wayne Lewis – executive producer, producer
- Mike "Nice" Chapman – co-producer (1)
- Tomi Trent – co-producer (1)
- Antonina Armato – co-producer (2)
- Danny Sembello – co-producer (2)
- Carol Roy – art direction
- Marki Sheridan – art direction assistant
- Scott Morgan – photography
- Kelle Kutsugeras – styling
- Rudy Calvo – make-up
- Chiaki Shimata – hair
- DeJae – hair
- Toni Greene – additional hair

Technical credits

- Paul Arnold – recording, mixing (1, 6), editing (1, 6, 10)
- Mike "Nice" Chapman – recording (1)
- Danny Sembello – recording (2)
- Dave Bianco – mixing (2, 4, 9, 11), editing (4)
- Jon Gass – mixing (3, 5, 8, 10), editing (5)
- Keith "K.C." Cohen – mixing (7)
- Jared Held – editing (2, 3, 5, 7, 11), additional editing (6)
- Wayne Lewis – additional recording (6)
- Tina Antoine – assistant engineer (1, 2)
- Kenny Ochoa – assistant mix engineer (1, 6)
- John Jackson – assistant mix engineer (2, 4, 9, 11)
- Darnell Sullivan – mix assistant (3)
- Toni Greene – assistant mix engineer (5, 8, 10)
- Thom Russo Jr. – assistant mix engineer (7)

== Charts ==
=== Weekly charts ===
Chart (1991–1992)	Peak position
US Billboard 200	134
US Top R&B/Hip-Hop Albums (Billboard)	25

=== Year-end charts ===
Chart (1992)	Position
US Top R&B/Hip-Hop Albums (Billboard)	70

Singles – Billboard
Year	Single	Chart	Position
1991	"Love Crazy"	Billboard Hot 100	75
1991	"Love Crazy"	Hot R&B Singles	7
1992	"Masterpiece"	Hot R&B Singles	3
1992	"Masterpiece"	Billboard Hot 100	3
1992	"Unconditional Love"	Hot R&B Singles	38
