= Sioux Empire Fair =

Fair held in Sioux Falls, South Dakota

Coordinates: 43°33′11″N 96°46′20″W

The Sioux Empire Fair is a fair held annually each summer in Sioux Falls, South Dakota, at the W. H. Lyon Fairgrounds.

The Sioux Empire Fair includes carnival rides, fair food, livestock shows, horse shows, and art competitions daily. Special themed days feature deals for senior citizens, farmers, daycares, families, and more. Among the free family entertainments are magic shows, hands-on activities, Old Mac Donald's Farm, The Pipestone Discovery Barn, music, and game vendors. Pro rodeo and local, regional, and national headline concerts are featured and are free with paid fair admission. The 87th Annual Sioux Empire Fair will be held in July 31 – August 8, 2026.

Established in 1936, the fair was not held in 1942–1945 because of World War II and in 2020 because of the COVID-19 pandemic.
