= Paso Robles Event Center =

Entertainment complex in Paso Robles, California

Coordinates: 35.6385°N 120.6873°W

- Interactive map of Paso Robles Event Center
- Former names: Paso Robles Fairgrounds (1946-86); California Mid-State Fairgrounds (1986-2005); Paso Robles Event Center (2006-present)
- Address: 2198 Riverside Ave; Paso Robles, CA 93446-1330
- Owner: 16th District Agricultural Association

Construction
- Opened: September 11, 1946

Website
- Venue Website

The Paso Robles Event Center, formerly California Mid-State Fairgrounds, is an entertainment complex located in Paso Robles, California. The site opened in 1946 for the annual "California Mid-State Fair" (originally known as the "16th District Fair" or "San Luis Obispo County Fair" [1946-80] and "San Luis Obispo County Mid-State Fair" [1981-85]).

In addition to the fair with a variety of rides, games and activities, concerts, trade shows, conventions, equestrian showcases, craft brewing festivals, roller derby competitions, and other events have taken place at the Event Center.

== History ==
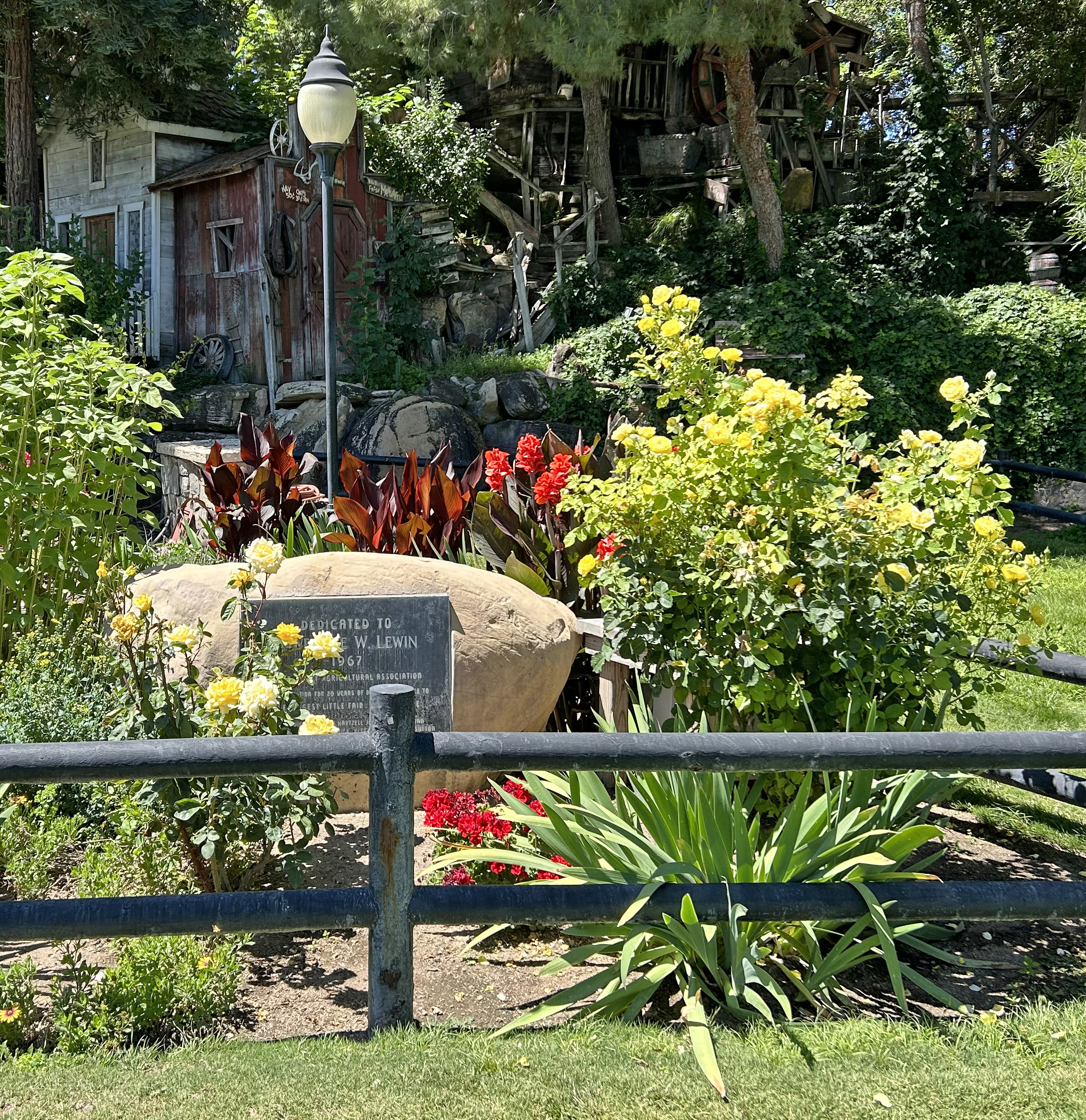
A small decorative flower garden is seen near the main entrance to the complex during the summer of 2023.

The fairgrounds were approved by the state fair board in 1946. In the late 1940s, exhibits included livestock, agriculture, horticulture, domestic science and arts displays, dairy products, bees and honey, poultry, and horse shows.

A flower show building was constructed on the center's grounds in 1968. The fair's flower show began in 1948 and by the early 1990s had grown to feature nearly 2,000 entries annually, either in the fresh-cut or arrangement categories.

In 1972, a moderately sized rock waterfall was added near the main entrance to the fairgrounds. The location added a life-size, thousand-pound bronze statue (sculpted in clay) of a horseback cowboy, named Cool Water, in 2003.

The waterfall was renovated as part of Maynard's Mountain in 2007, named in dedication to former longtime fair manager Maynard Potter.

The neighboring decorations, featuring marigolds, petunias, and ageratum, are now dedicated to Lawrence W. Lewin, formerly the manager of the 16th District Agricultural Association.

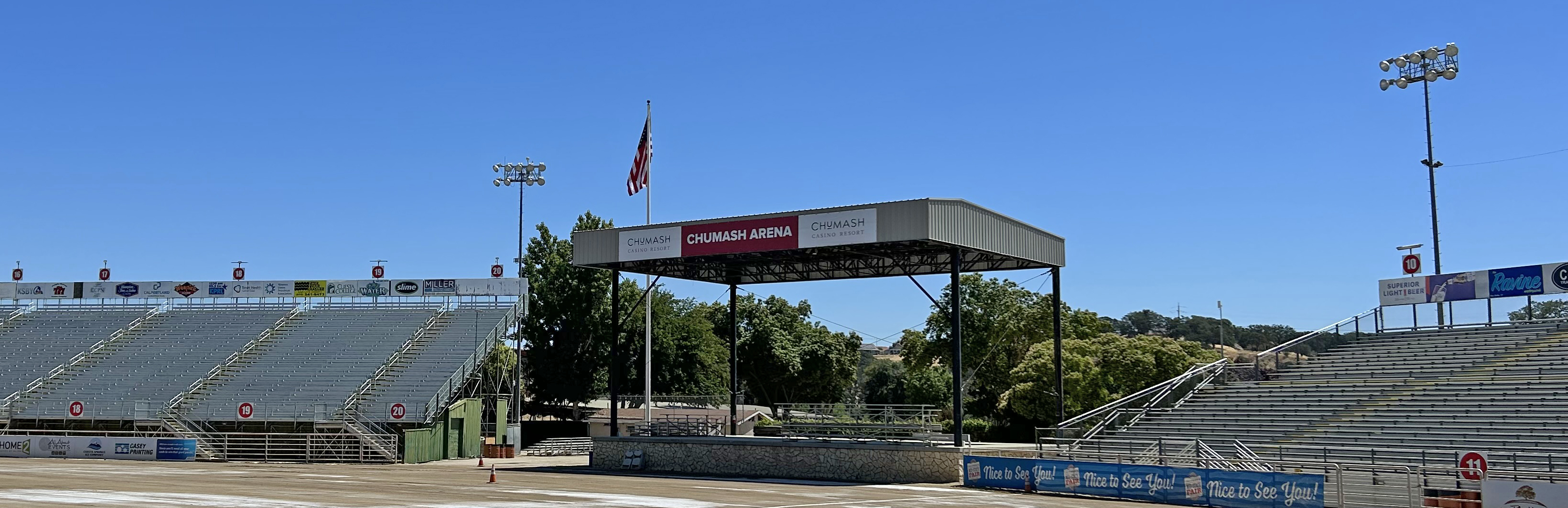
Chumash Arena within Paso Robles Event Center is pictured in July 2023.

The facility was renamed from the California Mid-State Fairgrounds to Paso Robles Events Center in February 2006 to reflect the variety of functions held at the location year-round in addition to the summer fair.

In February 2020, the California Department of Food and Agriculture awarded $1.39 million in funding to the event center. The funds were set to be used to improve Estrella Hall within the center.

The center's Ponderosa Pavilion has served as an evacuation space during area flooding.

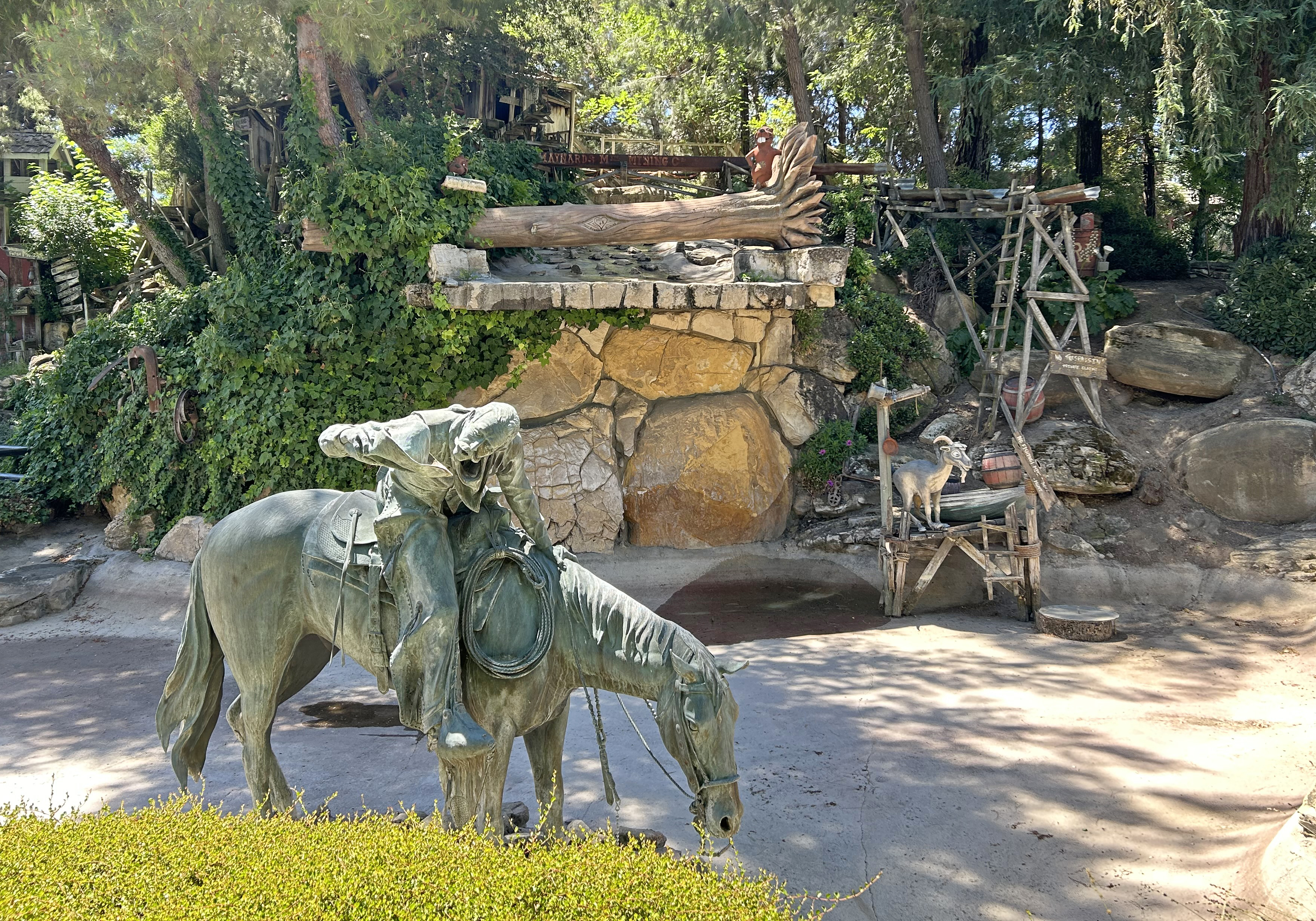
At the shallow basin to the Maynard's Mountain waterfall, Paso Robles Event Center displays a thousand-pound, clay-sculpted bronze statue of a horseback cowboy seeking a drink, entitled "Cool Water."

=== Concerts ===
Through the years, high-profile concerts to take place at the 14,600-seat outdoor Chumash Grandstand Arena (formerly Main Grandstand Arena) have included Lionel Richie in 1984, Dolly Parton in 1986, MC Hammer in 1991, Britney Spears and Def Leppard in 1999, Destiny's Child in 2001, Alicia Keys in 2002, Blink-182 in 2004, Tom Petty in 2005, Aerosmith in 2007, Kelly Clarkson in 2009, Weezer in 2010, Van Halen in 2013, Garth Brooks and the Chainsmokers in 2017, ZZ Top in 2018, and Nelly & T.I. in 2023, among others.

Musicians to have played the facility multiple times include Bob Dylan, John Mayer, Kool & the Gang, Alice Cooper, Tim McGraw, Demi Lovato, Journey, and Santana.

Meanwhile, at the southmost end of the center, the smaller Frontier Stage also features a variety of musical acts during the summer schedule.

=== Festivals and Events ===
Throughout the year, the Paso Robles Event Center hosts a variety of festivals and events. Due to the prevalence of the wine industry in the area, many of the events feature wine. The annual Paso Robles Rotary Winemakers' Cookoff is held at the Events Center every August, the Paso Wine Fest holds their main event there in May, and WiVi Central Coast uses the event center every March.

=== Emergency Facility ===
The Paso Robles Event Center is a designated emergency facility in California, including use as an equestrian and livestock emergency housing facility during natural disasters.

== See also ==
- List of convention centers in the United States
