= Gia Ventola =

American fashion designer

Gia Ventola is an American fashion designer who currently lives in Ipswich, Massachusetts, United States. She owns and runs Gia Ventola Couture, a fashion boutique in Peabody, Massachusetts.

== Early life ==
Gia Ventola grew up in Topsfield, Massachusetts: a town located less than 25 miles (40 km) north of Boston. An only child, she attended Masconomet High School, where she was a valuable player on the girls' varsity field hockey team. She had intentions to have a college and Olympic career in field hockey, but after sustaining an injury, Ventola decided to pursue the art of fashion.

== Career ==
Ventola first caught the public's eye when Britney Spears wore one of her pleather outfits during the opening act of Spears's 1999 tour.

Ventola got her start at Parsons The New School for Design in Greenwich Village, New York City, where she received her B.A. in Fashion Design. She went on to release her first line, Pop Ventolation, in 1998, which was debuted at the Girls Rule Spring 2001 show in New York City. Then, she premiered a new label, Gia's World. In the fall of 2005, Ventola launched her third line, the Gia Ventola Luxury Denim Collection in Europe and Asia.

Some of Ventola's celebrity clients include Cher, Destiny's Child, Pink, and Sheryl Crow. Ventola has also appeared countless times in the media in magazines such as Lucky, Oprah, Teen People, and Vogue. She has also appeared in newspapers such as the Boston Globe, on television, and on the radio.

== Gia Ventola Couture ==
Her fashion boutique, Gia Ventola Couture was opened in the fall of 2008, and is located between the North Shore and Liberty Tree malls, on Sylvan Street in Peabody, Massachusetts. The 3,000-square-foot (280 m^{2}) “Gothic baroque” inspired space, with black interior, concrete floors, and Belgium-made mannequins, creates a unique décor setting. It closed between 2012 and 2013.

Ventola's goal for the boutique is to expand it into a mini-department store, with a large selection of underground designs from international lines such as Belgium, Sweden, and England. The merchandise available includes clothing for all ages, a denim collection, t-shirts, couture dresses, jewelry, hats and belts.
