= Atlantic Starr =

American R&B band

- Also known as: Newban
- Origin: White Plains, New York, U.S.
- Genres: R&B, soul
- Years active: 1976–present
- Labels: A&M, Warner Bros., Arista
- Members: Jonathan Lewis; Shammah Carter; Melessa Pierce
- Past members: Wayne Lewis (deceased); Duke Jones; Sharon Bryant; William Sudderth III; Damon Rentie; Porter Carroll Jr.; Clifford Archer; Joseph Phillips; David Lewis; Barbara Weathers; Porscha Martin; Rachel Oliver; Koran Daniels; Aisha Tanner; DeWayne Woods; James Turner; L'John Epps; Crystal Blake
- Website: www.instagram.com/atlanticstarrband

Atlantic Starr is an American R&B band based in White Plains, New York. They are known for songs including "Always", "Secret Lovers", "Circles", "Silver Shadow", and "Masterpiece".

== History ==
Atlantic Starr began in Greenburgh, New York, with trumpeter Duke Jones (who left the band prior to their first recordings), drummer Porter Carroll Jr., bassist Clifford Archer, percussionist and flautist Joseph Phillips, Sheldon Tucker (guitar; parted ways with the band before the first recordings), and three brothers: David Lewis (vocals and guitar), Wayne Lewis (keyboards and vocals), and Jonathan Lewis (keyboards and trombone). The band's membership eventually stabilized around Carroll, Archer, Phillips, the three Lewis brothers, lead singer Sharon Bryant (who was later replaced by Barbara Weathers), trumpeter William Sudderth III, and saxophonist Damon Rentie (who was later replaced by Koran Daniels).

In 1977, the band came to Westwood, California, and performed on the nightclub scene under the name "Newban," which they agreed to change at the request of A&M Records executive Herb Alpert when they were signed. Having already agreed to keep the Starr part of an early idea for a new band name, the members decided to add the word Atlantic, because of their East Coast roots. The nine-member band were now A&M employees.

Throughout the late 1970s and early 1980s, Atlantic Starr scored several hits on the R&B charts. However, significant crossover success (onto the pop charts) did not come until halfway into the 1980s, with the release of their album As the Band Turns (their last on A&M Records), and the single "Secret Lovers". By this time, the band had pared itself down to a quintet, consisting of the three Lewis brothers, Phillips, and Weathers. In 1987, (after signing to Warner Bros. Records), the band solidified their pop success by scoring a No. 1 pop (and R&B) hit with "Always", a love ballad off their album All in the Name of Love. Following this success, Weathers left for a solo career, and she was replaced by Porscha Martin for the band's next album, 1989's We're Movin' Up. Although this album was not quite as successful as its predecessors, it did produce another No. 1 R&B hit with "My First Love."

The band continued to score hits on both the R&B and pop charts into the early 1990s. 1991 saw the introduction of yet another new female lead singer, when Martin was replaced by Miss Black America 1986, Rachel Oliver, for the album, Love Crazy. This album featured the band's biggest hit of the 1990s, with "Masterpiece" reaching No. 3 on both the pop and R&B charts in early 1992. The group toured to Japan in 1992 with yet another female vocalist at the helm, Crystal Blake, a studio vocalist for Stevie Wonder who had also sung the female lead parts on the minor hit title track for Eddie Murphy's How Could It Be album and Young MC's "Bust a Move."

Following the release of Love Crazy, Atlantic Starr's relationship with Warner Bros. Records dissolved, and in 1994, the band recorded one album for Arista: Time. That album was a commercial disappointment and the single "I'll Remember You" only made it to the fifties on Billboard's R&B and pop singles charts. Time (which was David Lewis' last album with the band) found a fifth female singer, Aisha Tanner, replacing Oliver. And when 1998's and 1999's All Because of You and Legacy were distributed by SoundAsia EX, and the small independent Street Solid label respectively, Atlantic Starr unveiled yet another lineup—one that consisted of two Lewis Brothers (Wayne and Jonathan) as well as Oliver (who had returned and replaced Tanner) and a new male singer named DeWayne Woods. Although Legacy received little attention, Atlantic Starr still continues to perform today and released their 13th album, Metamorphosis in 2017, featuring L'john Epps and Melessa Pierce.

=== Original members ===
After leaving Atlantic Starr, original drummer and founding bandmember Porter Carroll Jr. released a self-titled solo album (Porter Carroll II) in 1986. This album featured contributions from several prominent musicians, including Marcus Miller, David Sanborn, and former Starr bandmate Sharon Bryant. He has continued to do session work since that time, and is currently playing percussion in Daryl Hall's live band.

Following her exit from Atlantic Starr, singer Bryant embarked on a solo career and released an album in 1989, scoring several big hits on the R&B charts, as well as a minor Pop hit from the project.

Original saxophonist Damon Rentie went on to a solo career of his own, releasing his first solo album, Designated Hitter in 1985. His second and third solo albums followed in each successive year (1986 and 1987, respectively). He had also previously done session work with DeBarge.

Original trumpeter William Sudderth continues to follow an active schedule in the music business, performing in many diverse settings and having become one of the most sought-after horn players in the industry.

Founding member Wayne Lewis died on June 5, 2025, at the age of 68.

=== Cameos ===
In April 1992, Atlantic Starr appeared as themselves on an episode of the daytime soap opera Another World. They sang at local nightspot Sassy's during the episode.

== Discography ==
=== Studio albums ===
Year	Title	Peak chart positions					Certifications (sales thresholds)	Record label
Year	Title	US Pop	US R&B	CAN	NZ	UK	Certifications (sales thresholds)	Record label
1978	Atlantic Starr	67	21	—	—	—		A&M
1979	Straight to the Point	142	65	—	—	—		A&M
1981	Radiant	47	5	—	—	—		A&M
1982	Brilliance	18	1	—	—	—		A&M
1983	Yours Forever	91	10	—	—	—		A&M
1985	As the Band Turns	17	3	41	26	64	RIAA: Gold	A&M
1987	All in the Name of Love	18	4	23	34	48	RIAA: Platinum	Warner Bros.
1989	We're Movin' Up	125	26	—	—	—		Warner Bros.
1991	Love Crazy	134	25	—	—	—		Reprise
1994	Time	—	80	—	—	—		Arista
1998	All Because of You	—	—	—	—	—		SoundAsia EX
1999	Legacy	—	—	—	—	—		Street Solid
2017	Metamorphosis	—	—	—	—	—		Metamorphous, LLC
"—" denotes a recording that did not chart or was not released in that territory.

=== Compilation albums ===
- Secret Lovers: The Best of Atlantic Starr (1986, A&M)
- Classics, Vol. 10 (1987, A&M)
- Always - The Very Best Of (1993, Tusk Music Co. (Pty) Ltd.)
- Greatest Hits (1997, Dominion)
- Ultimate Collection (2000, Hip-O)
- 20th Century Masters: Millennium Collection - The Best of Atlantic Starr (2001, A&M)
- Secret Lovers (2006, KRB Music Companies)
- Newban and Newban 2 (2012 BBE Records)
- The Best of Atlantic Starr (2015, MMT)

=== Singles ===
Year	Title	Peak chart positions							Certifications (sales thresholds)	Album
Year	Title	US Pop	US R&B	US Dan	US A/C	CAN	NZ	UK	Certifications (sales thresholds)	Album
1978	"Stand Up"	—	16	26	—	—	—	—		Atlantic Starr
1978	"Gimme Your Lovin'"	—	—	—	—	—	—	66		Atlantic Starr
1978	"Keep It Comin'"	—	49	—	—	—	—	—		Atlantic Starr
1979	"(Let's) Rock 'n' Roll"	—	46	—	—	—	—	—		Straight to the Point
1979	"Kissin' Power"	—	—	—	—	—	—	—		Straight to the Point
1979	"Losin' You"	—	—	—	—	—	—	—		Straight to the Point
1981	"When Love Calls"	101	5	80	—	—	—	—		Radiant
1981	"Send for Me"	—	16	—	—	—	—	—		Radiant
1981	"Think About That"	—	—	—	—	—	—	—		Radiant
1982	"Circles"	38	2	9	—	—	—	—		Brilliance
1982	"Love Me Down"	—	14	—	—	—	—	—		Brilliance
1982	"Perfect Love"	—	32	—	—	—	—	—		Brilliance
1982	"Your Love Finally Ran Out"	—	—	—	—	—	—	—		Brilliance
1983	"Touch a Four Leaf Clover"	87	4	—	—	—	—	—		Yours Forever
1983	"Yours Forever"	—	—	—	—	—	—	—		Yours Forever
1984	"More, More, More"	—	11	—	—	—	—	—		Yours Forever
1984	"Second to None"	—	50	—	—	—	—	—		Yours Forever
1985	"Freak-A-Ristic"	90	6	—	—	—	38	—		As the Band Turns
1985	"Cool, Calm, Collected"	110	33	—	—	—	—	—		As the Band Turns
1985	"Silver Shadow"	—	13	—	—	—	—	41		As the Band Turns
1985	"One Love"	—	—	—	—	—	—	58		As the Band Turns
1985	"Secret Lovers"	3	4	—	1	1	8	10		As the Band Turns
1986	"If Your Heart Isn't in It"	57	4	—	11	66	—	48		As the Band Turns
1986	"In the Heat of Passion"	—	—	—	—	—	—	—		As the Band Turns
1986	"Silver Shadow" (re-release)	—	—	—	—	—	—	98		As the Band Turns
1986	"Armed and Dangerous"	—	86	—	—	—	—	—		Armed and Dangerous (soundtrack)
1987	"Always"	1	1	—	1	1	17	3	BPI: Silver	All in the Name of Love
1987	"One Lover at a Time"	58	10	16	—	—	—	57		All in the Name of Love
1987	"All in the Name of Love"	—	51	—	—	—	—	—		All in the Name of Love
1988	"Thankful"	—	65	—	—	—	—	—		All in the Name of Love
1988	"Let the Sun In"	—	—	28	—	—	—	79		All in the Name of Love
1989	"My First Love"	—	1	—	—	—	—	—		We're Movin' Up
1989	"My Sugar"	—	27	—	—	—	—	—		We're Movin' Up
1989	"Bring It Back Home Again"	—	—	—	—	—	—	—		We're Movin' Up
1991	"Love Crazy"	75	7	—	—	—	—	—		Love Crazy
1991	"Masterpiece"	3	3	—	2	15	—	—	RIAA: Gold	Love Crazy
1991	"Unconditional Love"	—	38	—	—	—	—	—		Love Crazy
1994	"I'll Remember You"	55	58	—	32	43	—	—		Time
1994	"Everybody's Got Summer"	—	—	—	—	—	—	36		Time
"—" denotes a recording that did not chart or was not released in that territory.
