= Music Mania =

Pop music concert series

Music Mania (also referred to as Summer Music Mania) was a series of annual concerts headlined by 2000s pop acts, that ran from 1999 to 2004.
