= Sharon Bryant (singer) =

American R&B singer (born 1956)

- Born: Sharon Bryant; August 14, 1956 (age 70); Greenburgh, New York, U.S.
- Genres: R&B; funk; pop; soul
- Occupation: Singer
- Instrument: vocals
- Years active: 1976–present
- Labels: A&M; Polydor; Wing

Sharon Bryant (born August 14, 1956) is an American R&B singer. She began her career as the lead singer of the R&B group Atlantic Starr in 1976.

== Career ==
Bryant sang lead on songs such as "When Love Calls" and "Circles". She left the group in pursuit of a solo career in 1984, and had moderate solo success with that effort. She would not achieve success on her own again until five years later, when the ballad "Foolish Heart" reached the top ten on Billboard's R&B chart. Another major R&B hit from the accompanying self-titled album, "Let Go" was also a moderate pop hit, cracking the top 40 on the pop charts (at #34) and charting at No. 37 on Radio & Records Magazine's Top 100.

In 2013, Bryant appeared as a background vocalist on Empire of the Sun's second album Ice on the Dune on the song "Keep a Watch".

== Discography, ==
=== Albums ===
Year	Album	Peak chart positions	
Year	Album	US	US R&B
1989	Here I Am	139	27

=== Singles ===
Year	Title	Peak chart positions	
Year	Title	US Pop	US R&B
1989	"Here I Am"	—	—
1989	"Let Go"	34	2
1989	"Foolish Heart"	90	7
1990	"Body Talk"	—	38
"—" denotes releases that did not chart.
