= Lou M. Taylor =

American business manager

- Born: October 30, 1965 (age 60); New York, United States
- Occupations: Business manager; entrepreneur
- Spouse: Rob Taylor (m. 1989)

Louise Mary Taylor (born c. October 30, 1965) is an American business manager and the founder and chief executive officer of Tri Star Sports and Entertainment Group. Taylor became a public figure in January 2008, acting as singer Britney Spears' family spokesperson amid Dr. Phil's alleged violation of trust in a family intervention. Taylor served as Spears's business manager from 2008 through 2020 and has been credited as the person who established her conservatorship.

In addition to her work in entertainment business management, Taylor has partnered with the Black Music Action Coalition (BMAC) since 2020. She has co-hosted the BMAC Gala and, in collaboration with Tennessee State University, supports the "Maymester" Music Business Accelerator, an educational program for college students pursuing careers in the music industry.

== Career ==
Taylor is a CEO of Tri Star Sports and Entertainment Group, which she established in 1992. The firm operates as a business management and multi-family office company, providing accounting, tax planning, royalty audits, tour budgeting, production accounting, and estate services for ultra-high-net-worth clients in music, television, sports, and digital media.

Over her career, Taylor has built a client roster that has included Mary J. Blige, Reba McEntire, Gwen Stefani, Florida Georgia Line, Priyanka Chopra, Jason Derulo, Jamie Lynn Spears, and Steven Tyler. She also served as Britney Spears’s business manager from 2009 until 2020.

In 2019, Taylor was awarded The Hollywood Reporter’s “Icon Award” at its annual Power Business Managers Breakfast.

A 2019 Hollywood Reporter profile described Taylor as "redefining what business management means in the 21st century."

Taylor serves on the Executive Leadership Council of BMAC, affiliated with Live Nation’s Femme It Forward mentorship initiative and associated with Mary J. Blige’s Strength of a Woman Festival.

=== Work with Britney Spears ===
In her 2008 memoir Through the Storm, Britney Spears's mother Lynne wrote that in 2007, Taylor and Spears's father Jamie, discussed the possibility of establishing a conservatorship for Spears. "Jamie was going to file for the conservatorship on January 22... but he and his business manager, Lou, felt God leading them to wait, fast and pray, despite the frustration of a phalanx of lawyers." Days before Jamie went to court in 2008 to put Spears under a conservatorship, he received a loan of at least $40,000 from Tri Star.

According to court filings referenced by The Los Angeles Times and El País, Taylor and Tri Star Sports & Entertainment Group denied involvement in the creation of the conservatorship. A 2022 filing stated that “Tri Star, Lou Taylor, and Robin Greenhill have all denied that Tri Star was involved in the creation of the conservatorship.”

Taylor was hired by Jamie as Spears's business manager and worked with the estate during the Circus Tour and subsequent years. Taylor's role became more prominent in the media following an ongoing conservatorship dispute between Spears and her father. In November 2021, Spears credited Taylor for establishing her conservatorship.

In response to public allegations that emerged in media reports and fan-led documentaries, Taylor denied any role in surveillance or control over Spears’s medical care. In legal filings and public statements, she asserted that “no one at Tri Star has ever suggested monitoring Ms. Spears’ electronic communications,” and denied knowledge of any hidden recording devices.

Taylor was also a party in a 2011 lawsuit involving Spears's estate and Brand Sense Partners, a licensing firm, over a fragrance licensing dispute. The matter was settled privately.

==== #FreeBritney controversy ====
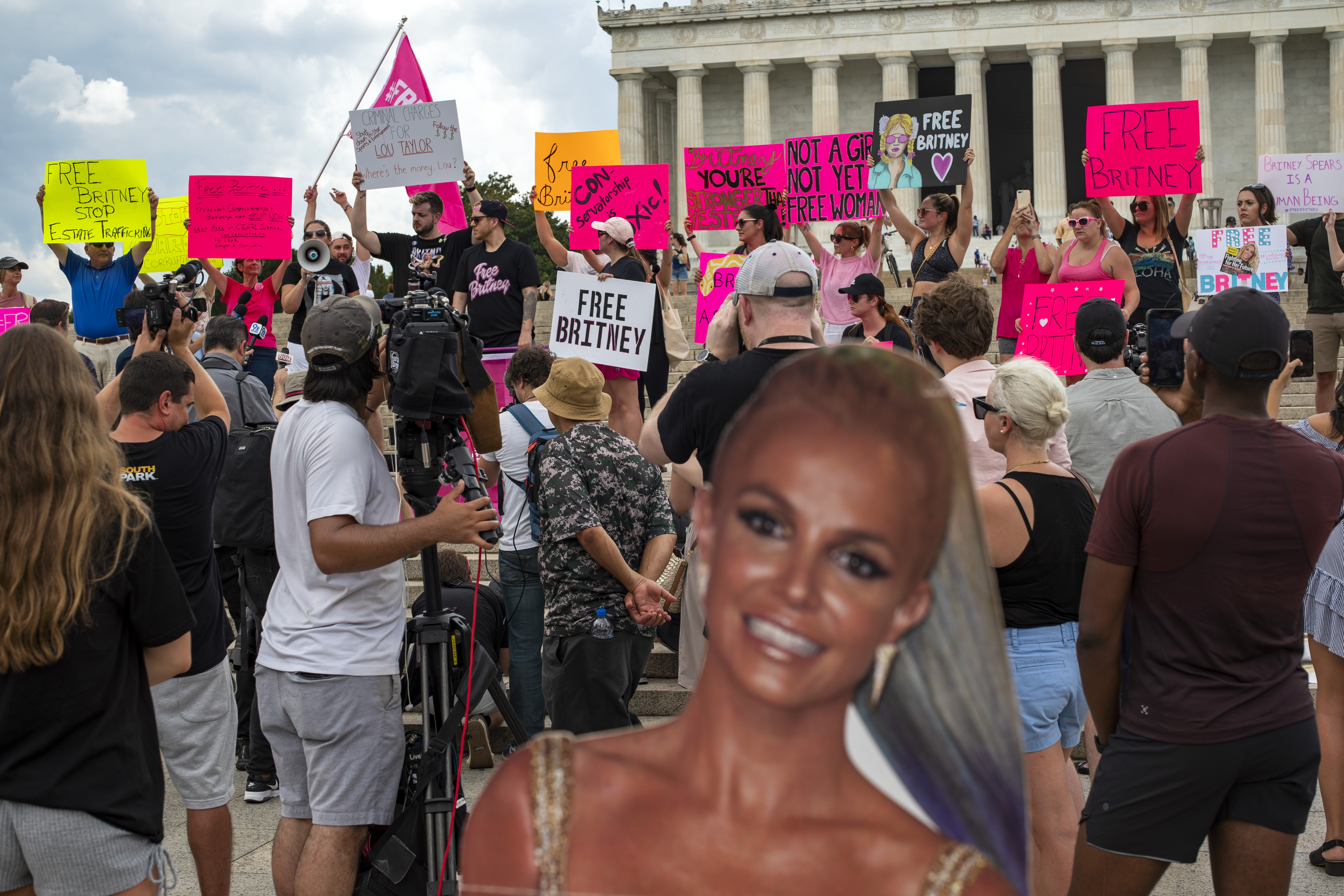
The #FreeBritney movement in front of the Lincoln Memorial, 2021. Taylor gained traction for her role in the conservatorship.

Taylor came to further prominence in 2019 with the rise of a movement to terminate Spears's conservatorship, dubbed #FreeBritney.

During a May 2019 hearing, Judge Brenda J. Penny ordered "an expert evaluation" of the conservatorship.

In 2019, Taylor was accused by supporters of the #FreeBritney movement of exploiting Spears's finances, a claim she alleged to be defamation, orchestrated by Spears's former manager, Sam Lutfi. Lutfi also accused Taylor of creating the conservatorship, and leaked alleged 2007 emails implicating her as a "stalker". The lawsuit was dismissed. Amid the controversy, comments by Taylor's client, Mary J. Blige, resurfaced; Blige revealed in 2017 that she owed $6.5 million in unpaid back taxes for the years 2008–2016.

On February 23, 2022, Spears alleged that Taylor invited her into her office at Tri Star a week before she was sent away to a health facility against her will. Spears also stated her intention to sue Taylor and her company Tri Star.

== Awards ==
Taylor has been recognized on several major industry lists, including:

- The Hollywood Reporter’s “Top Business Managers” list (2014–2020)
- Variety’s “Business Managers Elite” list (2014–2020, 2024)
- Billboard’s “Top Business Managers” (2016–2021, 2023–2024)
- Billboard’s “Women in Music” (2016–2020)
- Billboard’s “Country Power Players” (2018–2021)
- Billboard’s “R&B/Hip-Hop Power Players” (2020–2021)
- Among the honorees of The Nashville Business Journal’s “Women in Music City” awards list in from 2017-2019
- Recognized as one of Adweek’s “Most Powerful Women in Sports” in 2019
- Recognized as Live Nation’s “Femme it Forward” 2024 Honoree
