= Britney Spears conservatorship case =

2021 legal dispute over personal control

Britney Spears conservatorship dispute
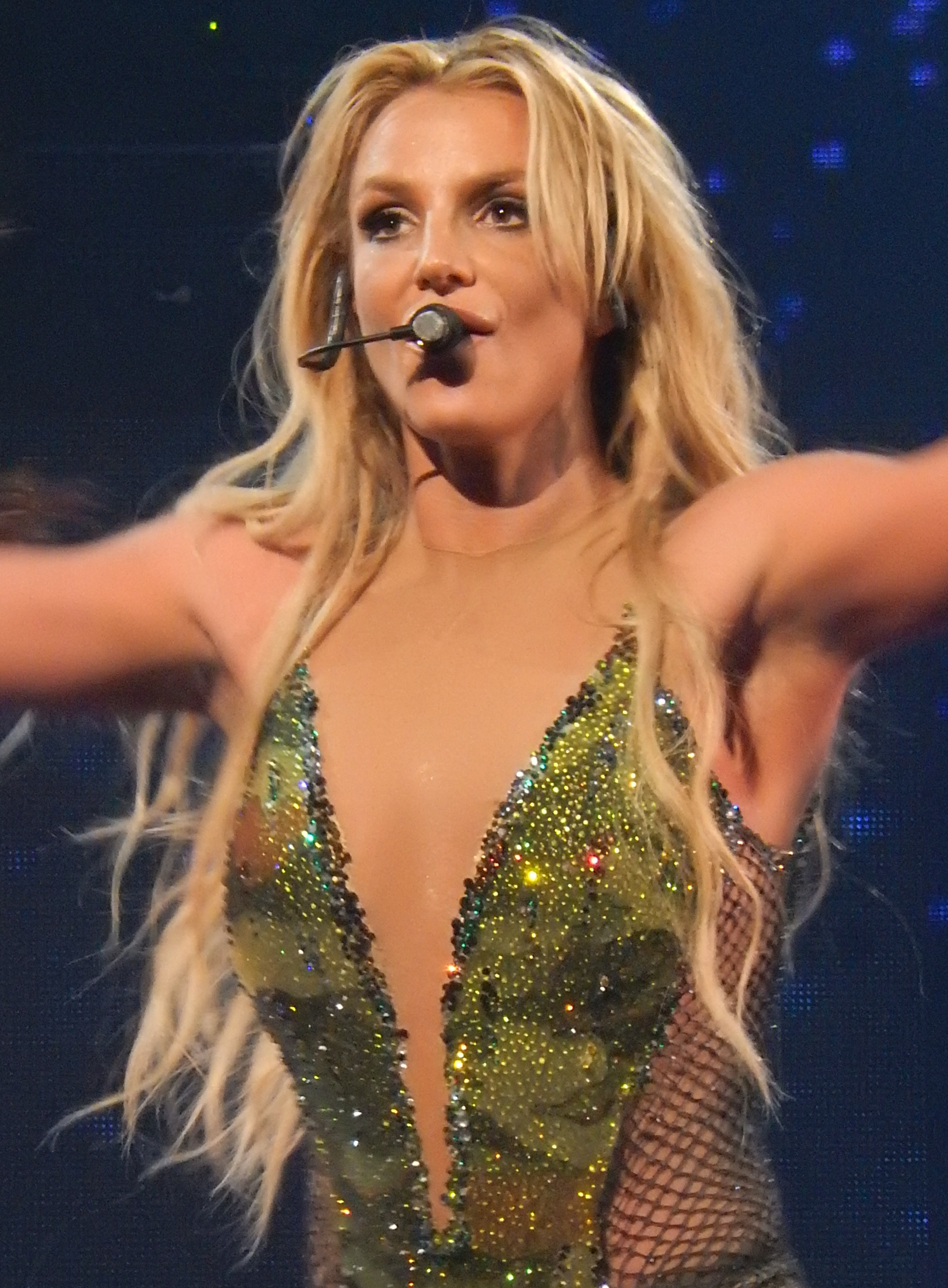
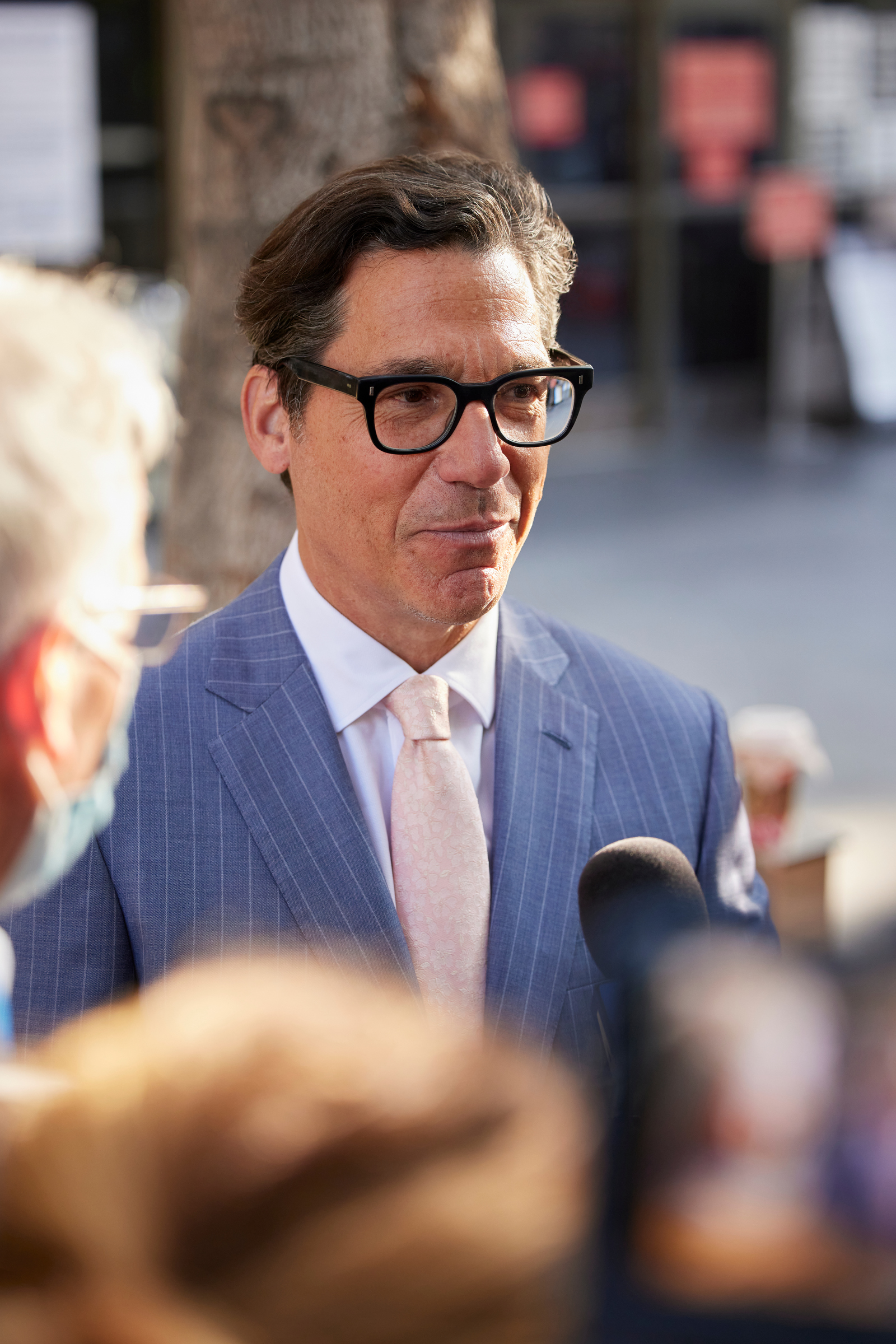
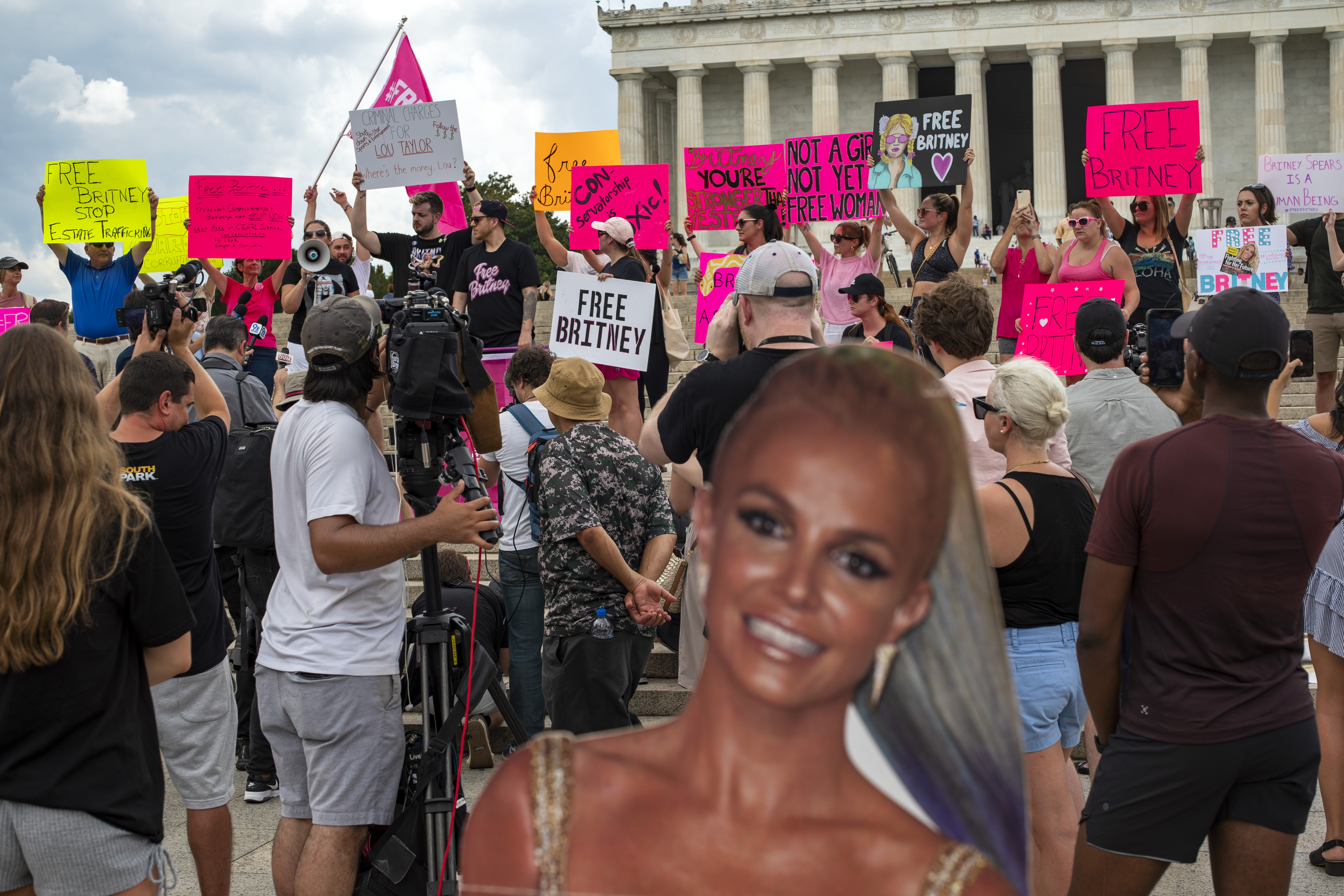
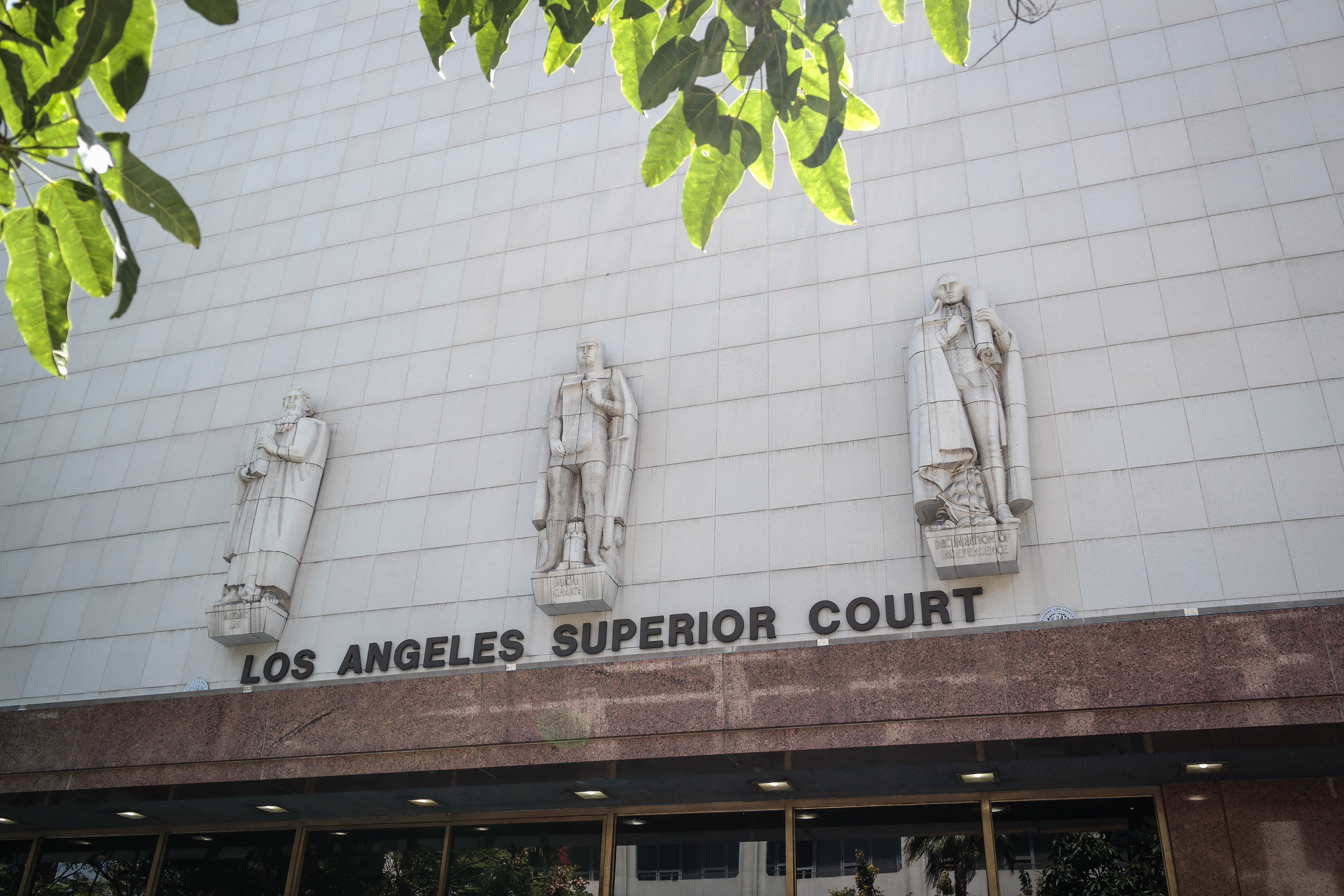
- Spears performing in London, England in 2016; Mathew Rosengart, Spears's attorney of choice since 2021; Stanley Mosk Courthouse, the physical location of proceedings; a #FreeBritney rally in Washington, D.C.
- Date: February 1, 2008 – November 12, 2021
- Location: Stanley Mosk Courthouse, Los Angeles, California, United States; 34°03′19″N 118°14′49″W
- Caused by: Allegations of abuse originating from fan speculation, media investigation, and public testimony
- Goals: Termination of conservatorship, investigations into alleged abuse, guardianship reform
- Methods: Litigation, protest, social media activism, boycott, legislation
- Status: Conservatorship terminated

Parties
Pro-conservatorship: Conservatorship of Britney Spears; Tri Star Sports & Entertainment Group; Spears family; Spears' professional management	Pro-termination: Britney Spears (conservatee); #FreeBritney movement and celebrities; American Civil Liberties Union (ACLU)

Lead figures
Jamie Spears (former conservator); Lou M. Taylor (former business manager); Conservators: John Zabel (Note: Chosen by opposing side.); Jodi Pais Montgomery; Andrew Wallet (f.) (Note: Stands for "formerly", or an individual who resigned from the position before its termination.); Jason Trawick (f.); Bessemer Trust (f.); Attorneys: Lauriann Wright; Vivian Lee Thoreen (r.) (Note: Stands for "removed", or an individual who was suspended and/or removed from the position before its termination.); Geraldine Wyle (r.); Jeryll S. Cohen (r.); Management: Larry Rudolph (Note: Does not participate in a court-ordered or legal capacity.) (f.); Robin Greenhill (f.)	Britney Spears (former conservatee); Attorneys: Mathew S. Rosengart; Samuel Ingham III (f.); Loeb & Loeb LLP (f.); Adam Streisand (r.); Jon Eardley (r.); John Anderson (r.); Other: Lynne Spears; #FreeBritney activists (including Britney's Gram, Britney's fans, and various celebrities)

In re the Conservatorship of Britney Jean Spears
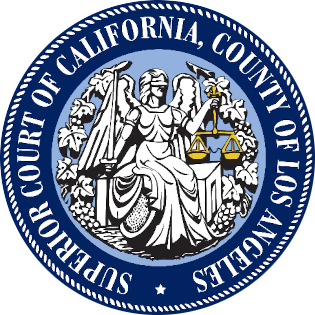
- Seal of the Court
- Court: Superior Court of California, County of Los Angeles
- Full case name: In re the Conservatorship of the Person and Estate of Britney Jean Spears, Conservatee
- Decided: February 1, 2008

Case history
- Subsequent actions: The conservatorship of both the person and estate were terminated on November 12, 2021

Court membership
- Judge sitting: Brenda J. Penny (2015–2021), previously Reva Goetz (2008–2015; retired)

Keywords
- conservatorship, guardianship, estate, abuse

On February 1, 2008, American singer Britney Spears was placed under a conservatorship by Judge Reva Goetz, with her father, Jamie Spears, and attorney Andrew M. Wallet, as conservators. The conservatorship lasted until November 12, 2021.

The management of the conservatorship by Jamie, Wallet, and Spears's former business manager Lou M. Taylor, among other parties, generated controversy almost immediately. While Spears was held on an involuntary psychiatric hold in early 2008 for alleged mental health concerns, there was initially a temporary conservatorship intended to last only days. It was extended to months and eventually made permanent, against the objections of Spears.

In 2019, Spears's career was put on hiatus when her father was hospitalized and she checked into a mental health facility, citing stress over her father's health. Shortly thereafter, details of the conservatorship leaked from inside the management team. Spears's longtime discontent with the conservatorship came to light in personal accounts and investigative reporting. Jamie's legal team maintained that the conservatorship was in Spears's best interests, and sought to keep it in place. In 2020, a social movement calling for termination of the conservatorship, #FreeBritney, attracted worldwide media attention, and grew dramatically following the release of a 2021 television documentary on the issue.

In June 2021, Spears made her first public statement in court proceedings and asked to terminate her conservatorship. She accused her father, family, and management of abuse, detailing instances of mistreatment, coercion, and conflict of interest. On July 14, Judge Brenda Penny granted Spears the right to choose her own attorney, former federal prosecutor Mathew Rosengart of Greenberg Traurig. On September 7, Jamie and his team reversed position and filed to terminate the conservatorship, allegedly to avoid discovery and deposition. Penny suspended Jamie on September 29, replacing him with accountant John Zabel; this allowed the conservatorship to continue until its termination. On November 12, Penny formally terminated the conservatorship.

The dispute and subsequent termination made Spears a symbol of conservatorship law reform and human rights across the United States, and served as precedent for legislation designed to combat such abuse on a state and federal level. The revelations of abuse and mistreatment endured by Spears during this arrangement as well as years in public life led to a reassessment of her legacy and public image, which was heavily distorted by the media and tabloids in the years leading up to her highly publicized breakdown.

== Background ==
Britney Spears is an American singer, songwriter, dancer, and actress. Often referred to as the "Princess of Pop", she is credited with influencing the revival of teen pop during the late 1990s and early 2000s. Spears has sold more than 150 million records worldwide, including over 70 million in the United States, making her one of the world's best-selling music artists.

For a number of years, Spears's personal struggles were widely publicized by the media. Amid these struggles, and potentially as early as 2005, Spears's father Jamie had "prayed and fasted" with business manager Lou M. Taylor to place Spears in a conservatorship.

In September 2006, Spears gave birth to her second son, Jayden James, with then-husband Kevin Federline. It was speculated that Spears suffered from postpartum depression. In November, Spears filed for divorce, citing irreconcilable differences. She and Federline reached a global settlement in July 2007 and agreed to share custody of their two sons.

In January 2007, Spears lost her aunt, with whom she was close, to ovarian cancer. In February, she shaved her head in a Los Angeles hair salon and attacked a paparazzo's car with an umbrella. In the following weeks and months, she was in and out of treatment facilities, and was often seen with associate Sam Lutfi, later accused of being a negative influence and against whom many restraining orders were issued. She also began a brief relationship with paparazzo Adnan Ghalib.

In April, Spears fired manager Larry Rudolph and mocked his team, sarcastically referencing a woman telling her to "go to the light and see Jesus". This was a decision her family disagreed with. Spears embarked on The M+M's Tour in May. In September, she was charged with misdemeanor counts, including a hit-and-run, after crashing into a parked car; that same month, she performed "Gimme More", the lead single to her then-upcoming fifth album, at the 2007 MTV Video Music Awards. The performance was extensively panned by critics, who criticized her choreography, and stage presence; it also generated a viral response in Cara Cunningham's "Leave Britney Alone!" YouTube video.

In October 2007, Spears lost custody of her two sons for undisclosed reasons. Later that month, she released Blackout (2007). It was her first album not to reach the top of the Billboard 200 because of a last-minute change in how album sales were counted, yet it has become widely considered her best and most influential work. Two months later, it was revealed that the Los Angeles County Department of Children and Family Services was investigating "multiple child abuse and neglect" allegations in court documents related to Spears's and Federline's custody battle.

=== Legal conservatorships ===
Conservatorship is a legal concept in the United States whereby a guardian is appointed by a judge to manage the financial affairs and/or daily life of another person because of physical or mental limitations. A person under conservatorship is a "conservatee," a term that can refer to an adult. A conservatorship may also apply to corporations and organizations. Spears was under a probate conservatorship, a type of conservatorship that typically lasts indefinitely and is used when the affected person is not expected to improve. The conservatorship may be of the "estate", wherein the conservator manages the conservatee's financial affairs and other monetary transactions. It may also be of the "person", wherein the conservator takes charge of overseeing the daily activities, such as health care or living arrangements, of the conservatee.

Spears was under both a conservatorship of the estate and of the person. As of September 2021, John Zabel was the conservator of Spears's estate; Jamie Spears served as conservator of the estate from 2008 until his suspension in 2021, and co-conserved with attorney Andrew M. Wallet from 2008 until his resignation in 2019. Briefly, Bessemer Trust was approved to co-conserve Spears's estate alongside Jamie in 2021 but withdrew days after her June 23 public testimony and official approval.

Care manager Jodi Pais Montgomery was the conservator of Spears's person; previously, Jamie was the sole conservator of the person from 2008 until resignation in 2019. Spears's former fiancé and agent Jason Trawick also served briefly as co-conservator of the person from 2012 until 2013.

== Timeline ==
=== 2008: Conservatorship established ===
==== Temporary conservatorship and initial dispute ====
On January 3, 2008, Spears isolated herself with two-year-old son Sean Preston and one-year-old son Jayden James in a bathroom, refusing to relinquish custody to Federline and his representatives as her visitation time ended. Spears's elder son Sean Preston had already been surrendered to her bodyguard. Federline called the authorities, who responded to Spears's residence. She was taken to Cedars-Sinai Medical Center amid paparazzi attention, placed under a 5150 involuntary psychiatric hold, and had her mental state evaluated. During the hold, Spears lost visitation rights, and Federline gained sole custody. Spears was released after 24 hours when doctors determined she was stable.

After her hospitalization, Jamie, his lawyer Geraldine Wyle, and Taylor exchanged alleged emails discussing potential conservators, including Taylor herself or her management company Tri Star Sports & Entertainment Group. They discussed judges for the case, specifically voicing concern for one who "[would] not give Jamie the power to administer psychotropic drugs" to Spears.

On January 31, Spears was placed under a second hold at the UCLA Medical Center. She was escorted from her home by a motorcade of ambulances, helicopters, and police. The reason for this second hold is disputed. A Spears source stated it was due to her refusal to take prescribed drugs, while other sources say it was requested by her psychiatrist after he determined its necessity. Lutfi said she went "willingly". In 2021, family friend Jaqueline Butcher cited a motivation for the hold (and later, conservatorship) as a means to remove Spears from Lutfi's influence, and that it came at her doctor's request.

On February 1, Los Angeles County Superior Court Commissioner Reva Goetz placed Spears and her estate in a temporary conservatorship at the request of Jamie, who became co-conservator alongside attorney Andrew M. Wallet. The approval process under Goetz reportedly took ten minutes. The petition claimed that Spears suffered from dementia; this was not corroborated by medical documents, including examinations that included the name of a doctor, J. Edward Spar.

On February 4, Spears contacted Adam Streisand while hospitalized to represent her, but he was released from court after lawyers determined Spears "lack[ed] the capacity to retain counsel". At this point, Samuel D. Ingham III became Spears's court-appointed attorney, while Vivian Lee Thoreen had begun to represent Jamie. The conservatorship was intended to last until this date; despite this, it was still in place on February 6, when Spears was released from the hold.

On February 22, Spears hired attorney Jon Eardley, who argued that her civil rights were being violated under the conservatorship, as it was established without "necessary five days notice" to Spears, and thus was invalid; he attempted to take the issue to federal court. Again, an attorney for Jamie filed that Spears was not fit to hire counsel, and Eardley was released from court on February 25.

On March 10, Goetz gave Spears a $1,500 weekly allowance and had her legal fees reduced as a result of financial obligations to Federline regarding custody. Spears continued to undergo psychological evaluations. Additionally, she was allowed to retain her entertainment lawyer, permitting her to appear as a guest star in the American TV sitcom How I Met Your Mother.

==== Permanent conservatorship and Britney: For the Record ====
On July 18, Spears regained visitation rights, with the chance to gain more as her health improved. Around this time, Spears began to work on Circus (2008). On July 31, the temporary conservatorship was extended to December 31. It was reported that Spears's behavior had improved, and she was able to spend more time with her sons.

In September, Lynne released Through the Storm, a memoir which "mended" her relationship with Spears. The book addressed Spears's and sister Jamie Lynn's childhood and fame from Lynne's perspective. Discussing Spears's troubles, Lynne alleged that Lutfi crushed pills and put them in Spears's food in an attempt to control her drug usage. On October 28, the conservatorship was made permanent by Goetz to protect Spears from "undue influence", giving Jamie indefinite control over Spears's estate and personal affairs. Spears did not publicly oppose the decision.

On November 30, MTV broadcast a documentary, Britney: For the Record (2008). In the film, Spears expressed discontent about life under conservatorship, saying, "There's no excitement, there's no passion [...] I have really good days, and then I have bad days. Even when you go to jail, you know there's the time when you're gonna get out. But in this situation, it's never ending. It's just like Groundhog Day every day."

In December, Spears was profiled for Rolling Stone by journalist Jenny Eliscu, who was in contact with Lutfi during the process. She later allegedly used this connection to assist Spears in a third attempt to retain counsel in 2009. On December 12, the court approved $1.5 million in payouts to the conservators, attorneys, and others connected to the case. This included Spears's brother Bryan, who received $200,000 for his role as the head of a trust in Spears's name. Jamie's monthly pay was increased from $12,000 to above $16,000 per month.

=== 2009–2012: Initial years and legal developments ===
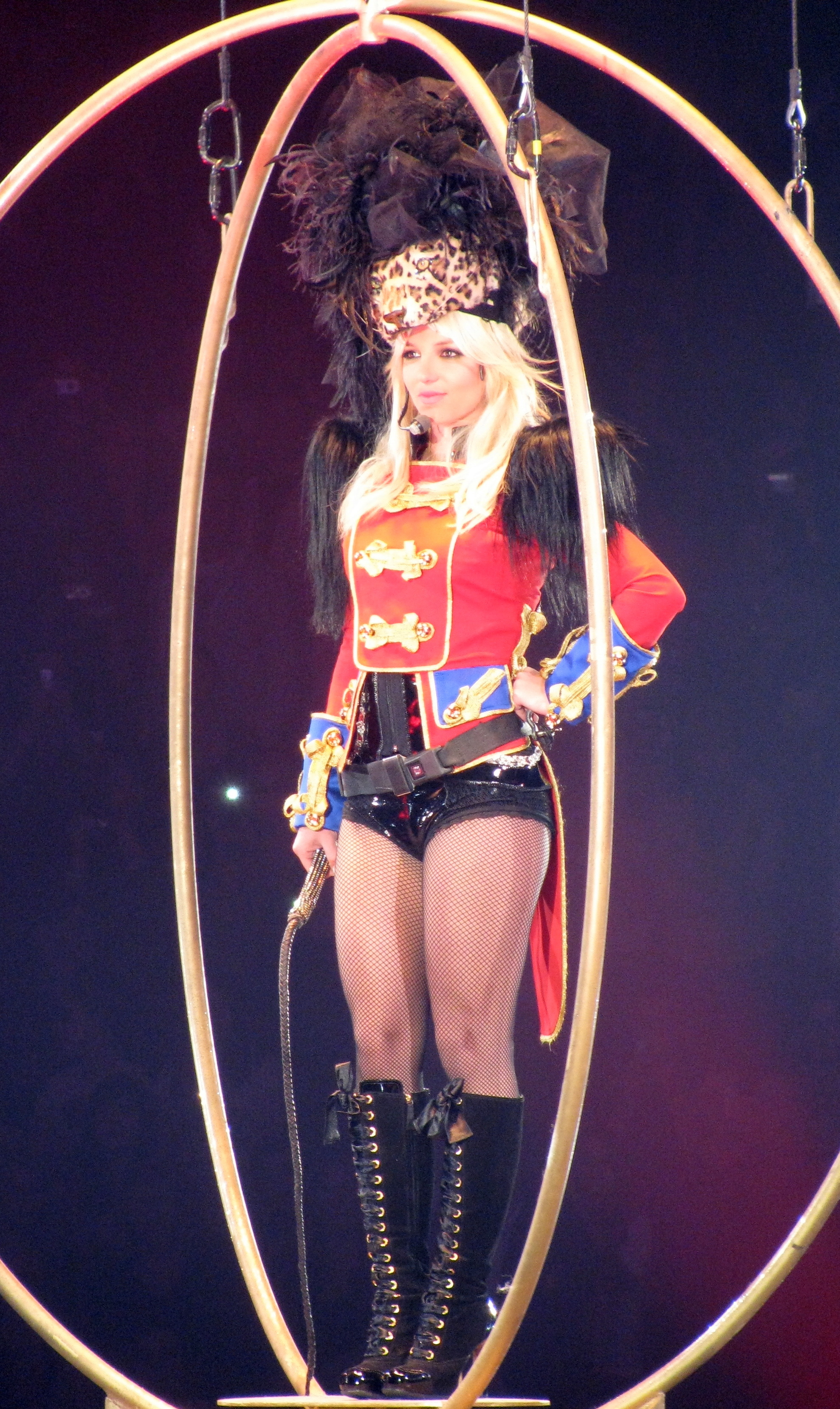
Spears performing in her Circus Tour in 2009

==== Lutfi disputes and first fan suspicions ====
In 2009, Spears began dating agent Jason Trawick. She also embarked on her Circus Tour, which was managed by her professional team including Lou Taylor, who became her business manager. It was alleged that at one show Spears was "distressed" that a contact high from weed would lead her to fail a drug test, preventing her from spending time with her children; her management ultimately decided that show would continue.

In January, Lutfi's sister Christina provided Spears with a phone she was not allowed to have; it was later found by Jamie. At the same time, Lutfi and Ghalib contacted a third attorney, John Anderson. By January 27, journalist Jenny Eliscu had assisted Spears in signing the legal documents requesting to replace Ingham with Anderson, allegedly meeting with Spears in the bathroom of the Montage Beverly Hills. Anderson notified Jamie of the petition; however, the next day, he abruptly resigned, an action which was the result of yet another decision in which Spears was deemed incapable of retaining counsel.

In February, Sam Lutfi began to pursue a defamation lawsuit against the Spears family due to Lynne's claims in Through the Storm. In March, an alleged voicemail by Spears was leaked online. Despite testimony from Christina, who stated Spears was "afraid of her father", the voicemail and other attempted phone communications between Lutfi and Spears, as well as her ex-boyfriend Adnan Ghalib and Eardley, resulted in three-year restraining orders granted by Judge Aviva K. Bobb.

By March 23, over $2.7 million of Spears's wealth had been used to compensate the lawyers since the beginning of the case. On March 27, Jamie attempted to sue the BreatheHeavy fan website for copyright infringement after owner Jordan Miller accused him of orchestrating an "imprisonment" and "exploitation" of Spears while stating "Free Britney". Reports said that Jamie intended to shut down the website.

==== Lawsuits amid Femme Fatale ====
In 2010, Lou Taylor began to professionally represent Spears's estate, which had then been conserved by Jamie and Andrew Wallet for two years.

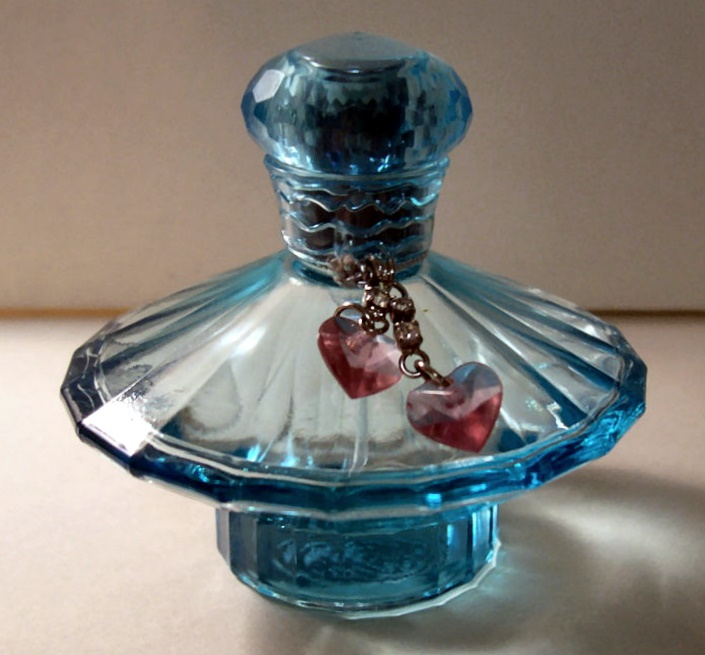
Curious, one of the fragrances that Spears developed with Brand Sense and Elizabeth Arden, Inc.

On March 30, 2011, amid the rollout of Femme Fatale (2011), Spears's estate was sued for over $10 million by licensing firm Brand Sense Partners after it failed to pay the 35 percent commission agreed with cosmetics company Elizabeth Arden, Inc. The firm described the estate's business practices as "wanton, willful and oppressive". The court had ruled Spears unfit to be deposed or to testify, but the firm countered that "the notion [...] is a sham. Ms. Spears currently has the mental, emotional and physical capacity to endure the strain of" various career and personal activities.

In May, Lutfi continued to pursue a defamation suit against Lynne, requesting Spears give a deposition and alleging that an evaluation might disprove the family's claims of her mental impairment. His experts argued that "she responds logically and coherently to questions, evidencing logical thinking and mental competency", citing Britney: For the Record and a TV interview Spears had with Ryan Seacrest.

By July 21, the Britney Spears Foundation, established by Spears before the conservatorship, saw a significant loss in assets, including a donation of $50,000 to the Nashville Christian organization Mercy Ministries. These transactions left the Britney Spears Foundation, which was intended to establish a children's summer camp for underprivileged performers, with only $17 in assets. According to The New York Times in 2021, Mercy Ministries regularly received financial support from Lou Taylor and, at the time, promoted conversion therapy programs; the estate's donations were purportedly approved by Spears, despite her public support for LGBTQ+ issues and intention to refrain from religious donations.

On December 16, Spears announced her engagement to Jason Trawick. On March 12, 2012, it was reported in Forbes, which was critical of the conservatorship, that the Brand Sense lawsuit had been settled.

==== Jason Trawick involvement and The X Factor ====
In a court hearing on March 22, sources indicated that Spears was "confident in her capacity to take back the reins of her life", but that the conservatorship remained for "financial and legal reasons". Partly because of her engagement, plans were being considered to eventually return her control of her estate. Despite this, on April 25, Trawick was approved by Judge Goetz to become co-conservator of the person alongside Jamie, who was "thrilled" by the developments.

The same day, Sam Lutfi scheduled a jury trial in his defamation case against the Spears family. In the lawsuit, Lutfi alleged that Spears's breakdown was caused by drug use, and again attempted to sue Lynne for her claims in Through the Storm. Later that year, the lawsuit was discarded by Goetz, and it was again reported that the conservatorship kept Spears from testifying in court.

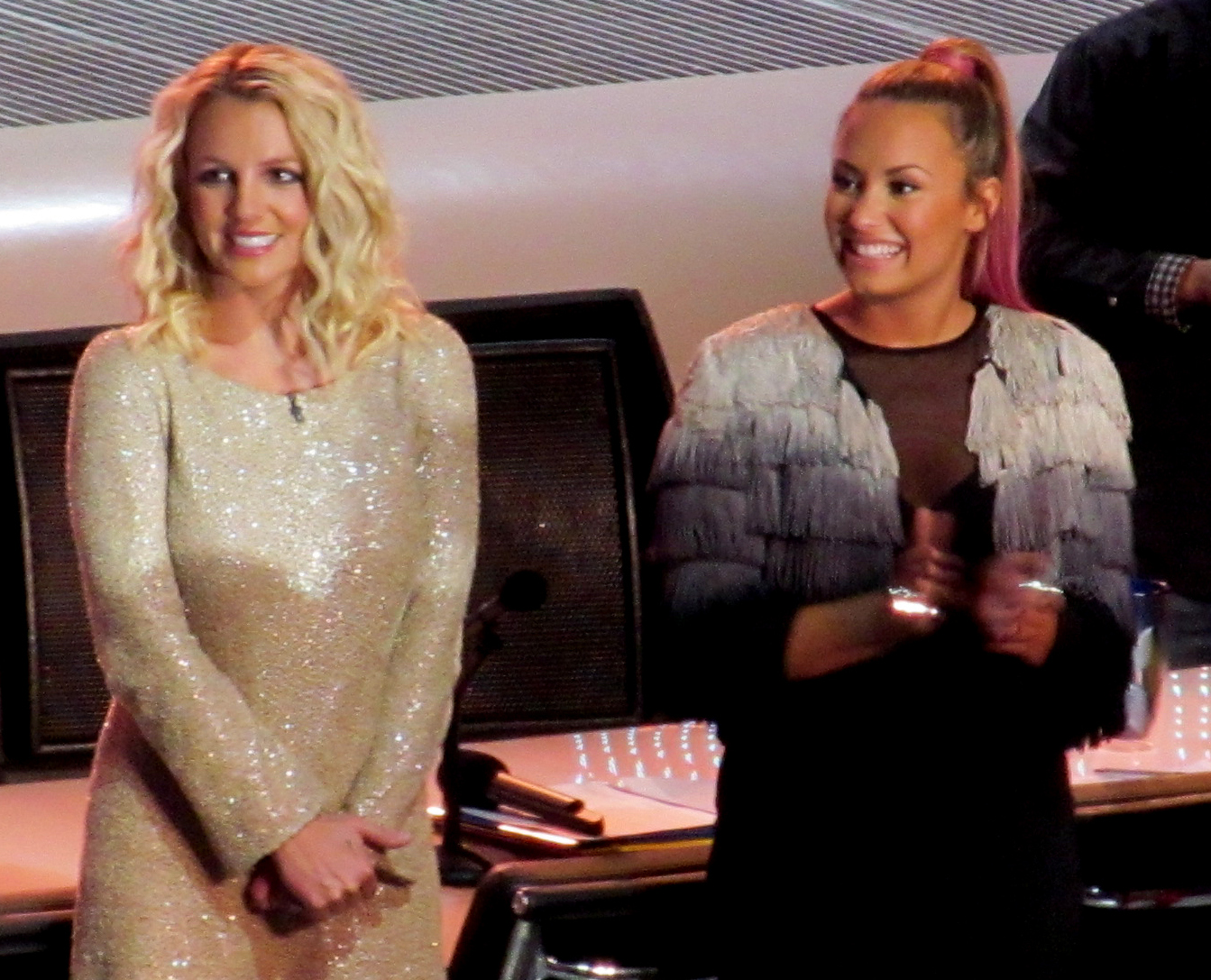
Spears and Demi Lovato on The X Factor in June 2012

On May 14, it was announced that Spears would join The X Factor as a judge. Trawick was "deeply involved in the negotiations" of the $15 million deal, which Goetz approved. Louis Walsh, who replaced Simon Cowell on the judging panel for a handful of episodes, would claim in 2021 that Spears was being heavily medicated, alleging that it impaired her ability to function during the shows. However, Forbes again questioned the necessity of the conservatorship the next year, citing her accomplishments on the show.

In August, Spears allegedly expressed frustration over the continuation of the conservatorship amid The X Factor. In October, it was reported that Spears's Internet and phone use were being restricted and monitored as a result of the Lutfi lawsuit.

In January 2013, Spears and Trawick called off the engagement, and he resigned as co-conservator of the person. Accounting records from 2012 were disclosed to the public in 2021, including a "consultation on dissolution of marriage". This led some to believe Spears and Trawick had secretly married before they called off the engagement. Trawick denied this, and legal experts, including Kevin Federline's representatives, debunked the rumors.

=== 2013–2018: Continued conservatorship amid career activities ===
==== Life and career changes under estate oversight ====
In March, Spears began dating David Lucado, causing her father to complete a background check on him. On March 29, the conservators sought approval from Judge Goetz for riskier investments for Spears's brand, which were granted. On October 17, Jamie asked the court for an increase in allowance; he had earned $16,000 a month since 2008, and requested an additional $2,000 per month.

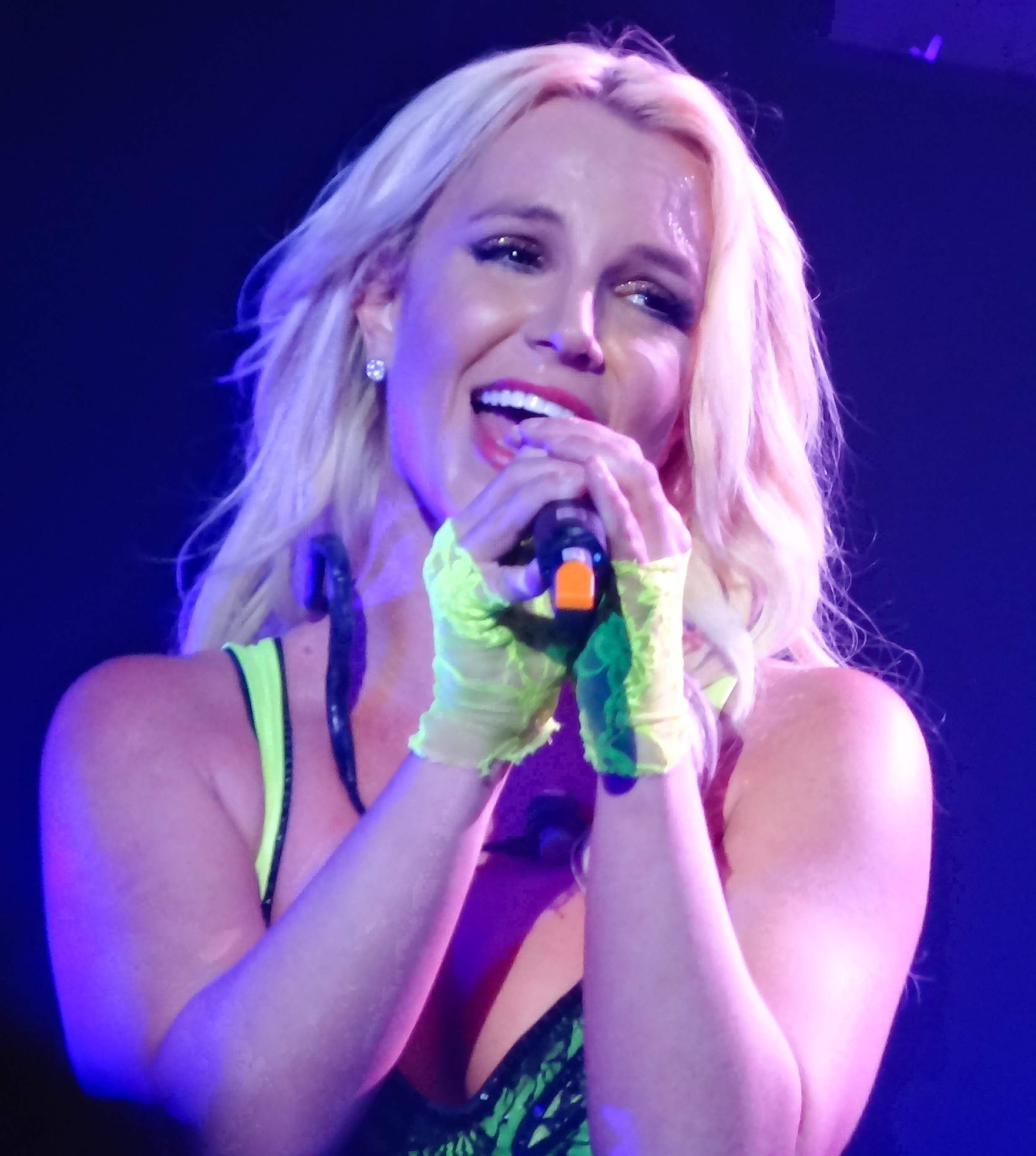
Spears performing in her Britney: Piece of Me residency in January 2014

In December, Spears released Britney Jean (2013) and began a two-year residency at Planet Hollywood Las Vegas. The residency contract specified that the deal between the estate and Caesars Entertainment could be canceled were the conservatorship ended. Lou Taylor's company, Tri Star Sports & Entertainment Group, had "an important role [...] budgeting, planning, and assisting with the negotiation".

On February 26, 2014, it was reported that Jamie's allowance request had not been granted, but he continued to petition for such; Andrew Wallet's salary as co-conservator was reported to be $35,500 per month. On March 14, the conservators allegedly took out an emergency $6 million loan, approved by Judge Goetz. On May 2, Jamie was approved to earn 1.5 percent of gross revenues from Spears's residency. On August 21, Spears split with Lucado after allegations of his cheating, which he denied; subsequently, Jamie banned Lucado from contacting Spears.

==== Glory and further criticisms ====
In 2015, Spears released a single, "Pretty Girls", with Australian rapper Iggy Azalea. According to Azalea, before having lunch with Spears, Spears's team searched Azalea's home to "make sure [she] wasn't trying to stash anything weird" and was not a "bad influence".

In May 2016, Spears was allowed to participate in a deposition in the Sam Lutfi lawsuit, four years after the case originally went to trial. Two days later, The New York Times published an article regarding the eight-year-long probate conservatorship, suggesting that Spears's deposition was an indication that her conservators might begin a "major unfastening of the strictures she lives under". Lucado was cited in the article, saying that "if anyone could see her interactions with her kids, they would know that there is no need for a conservatorship over Britney's personal life".

The article also criticized the financial aspect of the conservatorship, citing Elaine Renoire, president of the National Association to Stop Guardian Abuse, as saying "as long as she is bringing in so much money and as long as the lawyers and conservators are getting paid, there is little incentive to end it". The article also reported that Spears had been returned a number of significant freedoms since the conservatorship began, that she had made significant progress in her health, and that court proceedings and lawyers were in place to protect her from any abuse of power.

In 2016, Spears released her ninth studio album, Glory (2016), and promoted it alongside continuing to perform in her concert residency. The promotion of the album included performances at the 2016 Billboard Music Awards and the 2016 MTV Video Music Awards and appearances on late-night television and chat shows to promote the album. During an interview in support of the album on The Jonathan Ross Show, Spears spoke of the conservatorship, but this was cut from the televised airing of the show. In 2017, Spears embarked on her first international concert tour in six years, Britney: Live in Concert. It lasted one month and was modeled on the Britney: Piece of Me residency.

In March 2018, it was reported that Jamie was considering ending the conservatorship by the end of her Piece of Me Tour. Sources close to Spears had echoed this, stating that she was "feeling confident enough to take control of her life again".

In October, Spears announced Britney: Domination, her second Vegas residency, at Park MGM starting February 2019. Spears was expected to make over $500,000 for each show. The next day, Andrew Wallet asked the court for a raise amounting to $426,000 per year, citing Spears's "increased wellbeing and her capacity to be engaged", saying that "the next several years promise to be very lucrative". He called the conservatorship a "hybrid business model".

=== 2019–2020: Career hiatus and #FreeBritney ===
==== Britney: Domination postponement and beginning of hiatus ====
On January 4, 2019, Spears indefinitely postponed Britney: Domination after her father was hospitalized for a life-threatening spontaneous colon rupture. Spears stated that she sought to "put [her] full focus and energy on [her] family at this time". MGM Resorts said Spears had begun "an indefinite work hiatus".

In March, Wallet asked the court to resign from his position. The request was granted the next day. Wallet stated in court documents that "the conservatorship is engaged in numerous ongoing business activities requiring immediate attention" and "substantial detriment, irreparable harm and immediate danger will result to the conservatee and her estate if the relief requested herein is not granted on an ex parte basis". The action left Jamie Spears as the sole conservator of Britney Spears's finances. Soon after, Forbes published an article questioning if the conservatorship process could continue indefinitely with the resignation of Wallet. The outlet also reported that Spears could not marry her boyfriend of three years, actor Sam Asghari, without approval from the conservatorship.

On April 3, it was reported that Spears had checked into a mental health facility a week prior, as a result of her distress over her father's health. Spears confirmed this through a post on Instagram, her first social media post in nearly three months, stating she needed to take "a little 'me time'".

==== Start of #FreeBritney movement ====
In mid-April, an anonymous paralegal contacted Tess Barker and Barbara Gray, co-hosts of the Britney Spears fan podcast Britney's Gram, through a voicemail. Barker and Gray claimed to have independently verified the paralegal's identity. The paralegal claimed to have previously worked for Spears's conservatorship case, and contradicted public reports about the postponement of Britney: Domination and Spears's ongoing stay at the mental facility.

The paralegal stated that Spears "was not taking her medication as prescribed" and refused to take new medication; as a result, Jamie had pulled his support for the Vegas residency, which was then postponed indefinitely. He also claimed that Jamie had "verbatim said, 'blame it on my illness'". The paralegal alleged that Jamie sent Spears to the mental facility in mid-January months earlier than the official statement had disclosed, and that "there is no end date, particularly in sight for this stay at this mental facility to end". Though the paralegal acknowledged he had not spoken with Spears herself, he said that the stay "was not a decision she made at all".

Spears fans shared the hashtag "#FreeBritney" on Twitter and Instagram, calling for Spears to be released from the mental facility. The situation was discussed on TV shows including The Talk. Paris Hilton, a close friend of Spears, used the #FreeBritney hashtag in an Instagram comment. Spears's mother Lynne had also liked Instagram comments referencing Spears's situation.

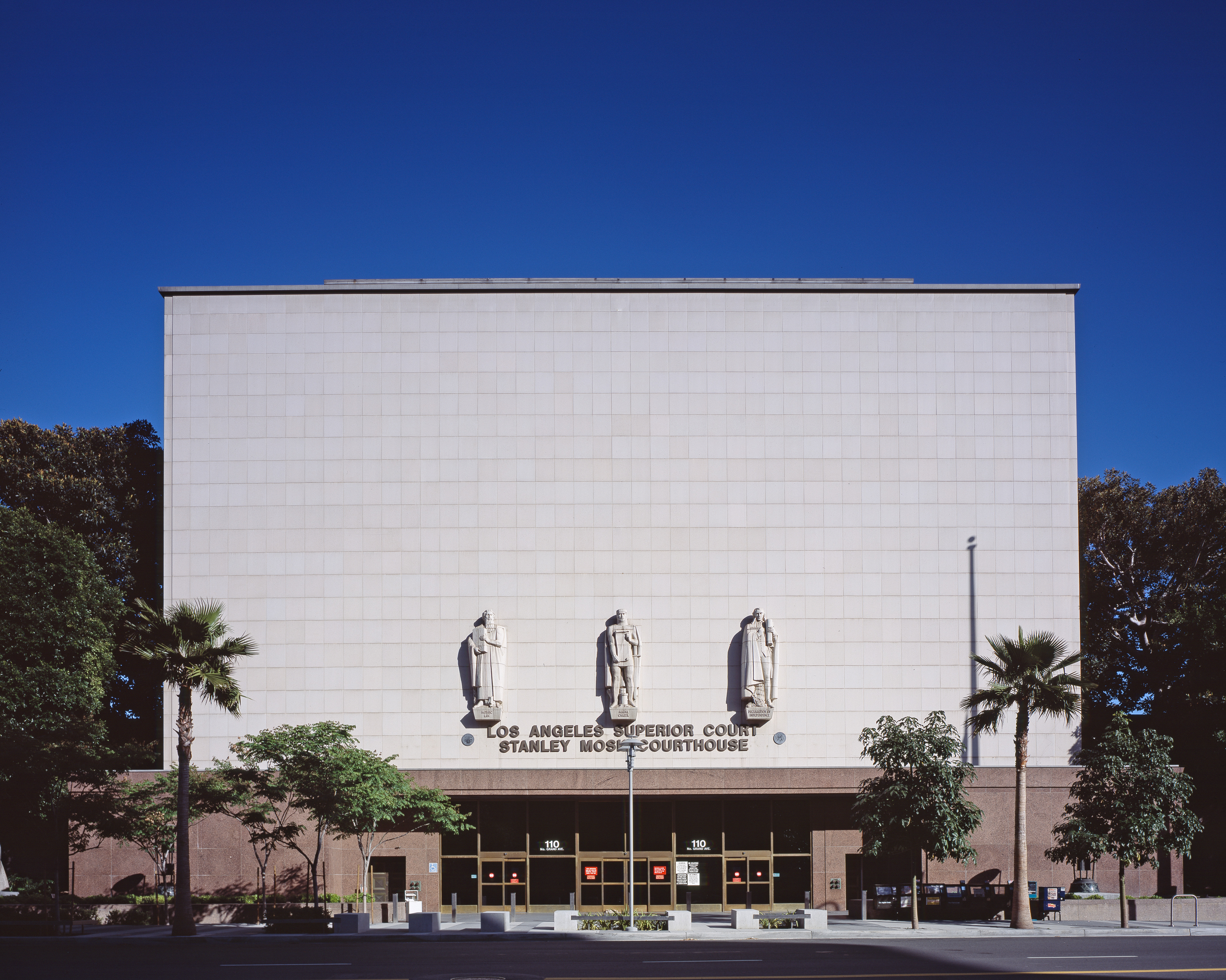
Stanley Mosk Courthouse

Fans including the hosts of Britney's Gram gathered outside West Hollywood City Hall in the first #FreeBritney rally. In response, Spears posted a video of herself on Instagram saying that "all is well" and captioning it with a statement that she appreciated the concern but asking for privacy "to deal with all the hard things that life is throwing [her] way".

Shortly after, Spears's mother Lynne Spears legally filed to receive updates on her daughter's conservatorship case; she previously had not played any legal or official role. On May 10, Spears and her mother appeared at the first status hearing for the conservatorship since her mental facility stay; it was reported that Spears spoke in the proceedings. Fans of Spears and #FreeBritney advocates also held a second rally at the Stanley Mosk Courthouse, the location of the court proceedings, as they took place. Around this time, Spears was released from the mental facility and given a cellphone that only permitted phone calls.

During this time, Spears's conservators and managers began to push back on #FreeBritney issues and conspiracy theories that the movement spawned. Jamie Spears began to petition the expansion of the conservatorship beyond California to other U.S. states and territories including her childhood state of Louisiana, as well as Hawaii and Florida; later, the conservatorship expanded to Alabama, Arizona, Georgia, Massachusetts, Michigan, Tennessee, Virginia, and the District of Columbia. Jamie sued blogger and #FreeBritney advocate Anthony Elia, creator of the Absolute Britney website, for defamation after Elia claimed Jamie was manipulating Spears's Instagram page. Spears's business manager Lou M. Taylor also sued another #FreeBritney advocate Bryan Kuchar for defamation, after the advocate used Taylor's name in website domains that accused her of masterminding Spears's conservatorship.

==== Jamie reduces role amid family incidents ====
On August 24, Sean Federline was involved in a "physical altercation" with Jamie during a family visit, in which Jamie broke down a door, "put his hands on [Sean]", and "violently shook" him after a verbal argument. Sean was not injured in the incident, which his brother Jayden observed. Kevin Federline and attorney Mark Vincent Kaplan filed a police report, adding that Spears herself removed her children from their grandfather after learning of the incident. On August 25, they were granted a temporary restraining order against Jamie.

On August 28, Spears and Federline modified their custody agreement, with Spears's custodial rights being reduced from 50 to 30 percent. Though the agreement was established in 2018, it was formalized in response to the altercation. Spears in actuality retained the children only 10 percent of the time under supervision. After an investigation, Jamie was not charged due to insufficient evidence. Spears was "very angry" about the incident and felt it put her custody "in jeopardy".

On September 6, Jamie stepped down as conservator of the person due to the altercation. He remained the conservator of the estate while Jodi Montgomery, Spears's "care manager", became conservator of the person in his place. On December 17, Jamie won the injunction made against Elia.

On March 4, 2020, Jayden Federline interacted with fans live on his personal Instagram account, commenting on his mother's hiatus and her relationship with Sam Asghari. Jayden stated he thought Jamie was "a pretty big dick", which sources speculated referenced the recent altercations. He was hesitant to make any statements about #FreeBritney. He expressed he would share more if he were to reach five thousand followers; however, his account was made private and all posts on his page were deleted soon after. Mark Vincent Kaplan said that Federline was "not happy" and responded "as you would expect a responsible parent to address it".

==== TikTok activism ====
Due to the COVID-19 pandemic, the April 21 hearing was postponed to July 22, and temporary orders within the conservatorship were extended to August, including Jodi Montgomery's temporary status as conservator of the person.

On July 2, Spears posted a TikTok video which ignited widespread speculation on the platform about her well-being, causing #FreeBritney to trend again and generate celebrity support. Public scrutiny of the conservatorship also spread many conspiracy theories about her health and rights. Amid the trend, there was an increase in news coverage of the hashtag; Vox described it as "a familiar rallying cry". Advocates started a Change.org petition and a White House petition calling for a congressional investigation into the conservatorship; both were signed by hundreds of thousands of people.

On July 12, photographer Andrew Gallery, who worked with Spears in 2008, uploaded a series of viral TikToks sharing a years-old letter written by her in third person. He claimed it was a copy of an original "destroyed" by the conservators. The letter describes events in 2008 differently from how they were reported, while saying "she was lied to and set up. Her children were taken away and she did spin out of control which any mother would in those circumstances". Spears also wrote that the conservatorship could continue "as long as the people are getting paid".

On July 13, Lynne filed to be informed of all financial decisions in the conservatorship. On July 22, both Jamie and Lynne appeared at the postponed hearing on Zoom. Spears did not appear as scheduled due to "technical difficulties". During the hearing, a new ruling sealed all future proceedings in the conservatorship from the public. #FreeBritney activists, spurred by the TikTok trend, again appeared in-person at the Stanley Mosk Courthouse during proceedings.

On July 23, Bryan Spears appeared on a podcast and described the conservatorship as "frustrating" to her. Though he stated that she had "always wanted to get out" of it, he asserted that the arrangement was "a great thing for [his] family". He added that Jamie had "done the best he could" with the family situation. Jamie continued to maintain that the movement was based on conspiracy theories, calling it "a joke" and condemning death threats, and denied any accusations of fraud.

==== Litigation amid #FreeBritney and first public endorsements ====
In August, it was reported that the conservatorship proceedings cost Spears over $1 million in 2019 alone. The same month, Lou Taylor resigned as business manager after she received death threats from #FreeBritney activists in light of her connection to the case.

In early September 2020, Jamie filed a motion to seal certain filings regarding the case from the public. On September 4, Sam Ingham filed documents in response, which included the first public endorsements of #FreeBritney from Spears's legal team:

Far from being a conspiracy theory or a "joke" as James reportedly told the media, in large part this scrutiny is a reasonable and even predictable result of James' aggressive use of the sealing procedure over the years to minimize the amount of meaningful information made available to the public. Whatever merits his strategy might have had years ago when Britney was trying to restart her career, at this point in her life when she is trying to regain some measure of personal autonomy, Britney welcomes and appreciates the informed support of her many fans. Although the sealing motion is supposedly for her "protection", Britney herself is vehemently opposed to this effort by her father to keep her legal struggle hidden away in the closet as a family secret.

On November 10, Judge Brenda J. Penny approved Spears's request to appoint Bessemer Trust. During the court proceedings, Ingham stated that Spears had told him she was afraid of her father and had chosen not to perform while he remained her conservator. Despite this, Jamie's attorney Vivian Lee Thoreen stated that there was not a "shred of evidence" that corroborated Ingham's claims.

=== 2021: Public testimony and termination of conservatorship ===
==== Public outcry after Framing Britney Spears ====
On February 4, 2021, The New York Times released the Emmy-nominated television documentary Framing Britney Spears (2021), directed by Samantha Stark. The film garnered massive public attention, and pushed #FreeBritney into the mainstream. It included testimony from various figures in Spears's life, including former assistant Felicia Culotta and former attorney Adam Streisand. Other individuals who appeared included paparazzi, media figures, music experts, and #FreeBritney activists. Jamie's former attorney Vivian Lee Thoreen, who was not representing him at the time of filming, appeared; she would later rejoin Jamie's legal team afterward.

Much of the film shed light on how Spears's depiction by media was often "hyper-sexualized", and how that portrayal played a role in "intense tabloid scrutiny". It ignited criticism of paparazzo Daniel Ramos, who appeared in the film. The film also portrayed Justin Timberlake in the context of his high-profile relationship and breakup with Spears; Timberlake apologized in an Instagram post, which also contained an apology to Janet Jackson in reference to the Super Bowl XXXVIII halftime show controversy. Dutch presenter Ivo Niehe, journalist Diane Sawyer, former First Lady of Maryland Kendel Ehrlich, journalist Matt Lauer, and comedian Sarah Silverman faced widespread criticism for past comments about Spears. In contrast, Craig Ferguson was acclaimed for his refusal to joke about Spears's struggles when a past segment of his show went viral.

In response to the outcry, Sam Asghari released a statement on his Instagram that he had "zero respect for someone trying to control our relationship and constantly throwing obstacles in our way", referring to Jamie as "a total dick". Spears herself stated that she did not watch the film in its entirety, but the portions she did made her "embarrassed", adding that she "cried for two weeks".

On March 3, Vivian Lee Thoreen justified Jamie's role as conservator due to his actions in protecting Spears's finances and custody agreements, and said that court investigators have allowed the conservatorship to continue under their oversight. She also stated that he "would love nothing more" than the end of Spears's conservatorship, and that his actions were in her best interests. In late March, Ingham petitioned to make Jodi Montgomery's role permanent, and for Jamie be completely removed. On April 1, Jamie asked Spears to pay $2 million in legal fees due to the increased litigation.

==== June 23 testimony and aftermath ====
At routine proceedings on April 27, 2021, Sam Ingham expressed to the court that Spears had requested to speak to Penny directly and "on an expedited basis". Penny set a June 23 date for the testimony. On June 17, an "interested party" by the name Stan Wantuch filed a petition to terminate the conservatorship. Ingham stated that he "[did not] know anything about the filing". Wantuch appeared to have no major connection to the case but claimed to be a "friend", "debtor", and "heir" of Spears. The petition required a $90 fee, but the fee was waived by the courts.

On June 22, The New York Times reported that, in confidential documents obtained by the newspaper, Spears had expressed her desire to end the conservatorship long before it was publicly known, stating that it had "too much control". Spears also cited her father's alcoholism when questioning his fitness to serve as her conservator. The article also detailed the strained relationship between Spears and her father Jamie.

The day before her testimony, Spears called 911 from a lobby phone at a police station and reported herself as a victim of conservatorship abuse. Officers later met Spears at her residence. In September, journalist Ronan Farrow reported that Spears had intended "to establish [...] something illegal was happening". As a result of this call, which was made unavailable to the public due to an "ongoing investigation", Spears's team reportedly discussed actions to take were she to go "rogue".

On June 23, Spears testified in a public court session that was audio streamed for the media and public. In the 24-minute statement, Spears detailed instances where she was forced to work or perform and was threatened with lawsuits and lifestyle restrictions if she did not cooperate; she claimed that the conservatorship was abusive. Spears said medical professionals medicated her with drugs, including lithium, without her consent; compared her 2019 mental health facility stay to sex trafficking; expressed that she was subject to unnecessary and excessive psychological evaluations; stated that her conservators failed to supply her with self-care; and shared that she was prevented from marrying and having a child, the latter as a result of an intrauterine device implemented without Spears's consent, one that she had since been prevented from removing.

Spears revealed that her statements assuring the public of her well-being were untrue. She expressed throughout her statement that she felt "in shock", "traumatized", "so angry it's insane", "depressed", "like [she] was dead", and "alone". In the testimony, Spears expressed to Penny:

I didn't want to say any of this to anybody, to the public, because I thought people would make fun of me or laugh at me and say, "she's lying, she's got everything, she's Britney Spears". I'm not lying. I just want my life back, and it's been thirteen years, and it's enough. It's been a long time since I've owned my money, and it's my wish and my dream for all of this to end without being tested. Again, it makes no sense whatsoever for the State of California to sit back and watch me make a living for so many people, and pay so many people—trucks and buses on tour, on the road with me—and be told I'm not good enough. But I'm great at what I do, and I allow these people to control what I do, ma'am, and it's enough. It makes no sense at all.

Spears would also criticize her father and conservator Jamie for approving the abuses, and the rest of her family for failing to support her. Additionally, Spears requested various changes in the conservatorship, including developing a reconstructed care plan, handpicking her own attorney, and filing to terminate the conservatorship altogether.

On June 25, Spears's ex-husband Kevin Federline supported her wishes to end the conservatorship. His attorney, Mark Vincent Kaplan, stated that Federline wanted her to be "happy and healthy", but also described that "there are financial issues that have to be addressed" in connection to the continued parenting obligations that Spears and Federline share.

On June 30, Jamie Spears called for an investigation into Spears's claims, and accused Jodi Montgomery, his temporary replacement as conservator of the person, of overseeing the abuses described by Spears in her testimony. He cited his approval of Jason Trawick's 2011 engagement to Spears as evidence of Montgomery's abuse. He also claimed that he had not spoken to his daughter in two years, but this contradicted his lawyer, Vivian Lee Thoreen, who said previously that the two had many conversations in 2020. On the same day, Montgomery's lawyer released a statement that denied Jamie's allegations, stating that she had been "a tireless advocate" for Spears.

On the same day, Penny denied the motion to remove Jamie Spears as conservator of the estate, while simultaneously approving Bessemer Trust to co-conserve alongside Spears. The actions were made in relation to motions from November 2020 and were unrelated to the June 23 hearing. The next day, Bessemer Trust filed a petition to withdraw from the conservatorship, citing Spears's hearing. The company had taken no assets or fees, as their role had not yet taken effect despite approval by the courts.

On June 30, Los Angeles County courts suspended their remote audio streaming program after an illegal recording of Spears's testimony was leaked online. Under California laws, recording and distributing court audio without consent from the presiding judge are prohibited.

On July 2, rapper Iggy Azalea, who previously collaborated with Spears, posted a statement on social media supporting Spears. Azalea voiced her opinion that the arrangement was "illegal", expressed concern for Spears's mental health under the conservatorship, and added that she had personally witnessed the alleged abuse. Emphasizing that she believed Spears was "not exaggerating or lying", Azalea described moments where Spears was restricted from "trivial" tasks, such as drinking soda. Azalea also claimed that Jamie Spears had forced her to sign a non-disclosure agreement under duress, moments before she performed "Pretty Girls" alongside Spears at the 2015 Billboard Music Awards.

On July 3, journalists Ronan Farrow and Jia Tolentino published an investigative article on The New Yorker that disclosed previously unknown details about Spears's conservatorship. In the article, Jaqueline Butcher, a Spears family friend, alleged that Jamie was verbally abusive. Jamie reportedly called Spears "fat", accused her of being "a whore and a terrible mother", and often exclaimed "I am Britney Spears!" in verbal disputes with Lynne regarding her access to her daughter. Butcher, who testified in favor of the conservatorship in 2008, expressed her regrets in the article, saying, "at the time I thought I was helping [...] I helped a corrupt family seize all this control", adding that "it was supposed to be temporary".

The investigative article also revealed details about Spears's social media usage. It was reported that Spears provides her own content to CrowdSurf, a social media marketing company, which uploads the content after screening for topics that are "too sensitive", which include the conservatorship.

==== Resignations and litigation under new counsel ====
On July 6, Spears's manager of 25 years, Larry Rudolph, formally resigned from his position in a letter to the conservators. He explained that Spears's alleged "intention to officially retire" was the reason for his resignation. Later that day, Spears's court-appointed lawyer Samuel D. Ingham III, alongside law firm Loeb & Loeb LLP, resigned from the conservatorship case, effective upon the appointment of new counsel.

On July 7, Lynne Spears called on the court to allow Spears to select her own counsel. Through attorney Gladstone Jones, Lynne stated that Spears's "capacity is certainly different today than it was in 2008," and also called her June 23 testimony "very courageous". The same day, Jodi Montgomery petitioned for additional security as a result of increased frequency in "threatening posts"; the security was estimated to have cost $50,000 a month. On July 8, it was reported that Jamie Spears, the Spears family, and Sam Ingham also received an increased number of death threats after Spears's testimony. Jamie Spears also filed a petition objecting to Montgomery's request for additional security, but the petition clarified that it was "not meant in any way to minimize the threats to Ms. Montgomery", and rather was due to the substantial cost of the security. On July 10, Montgomery pushed back against Jamie's claims that she mistreated Spears as conservator, alleging that Jamie had previously used $2 million of Spears's money "to defend himself" as conservator of the estate.

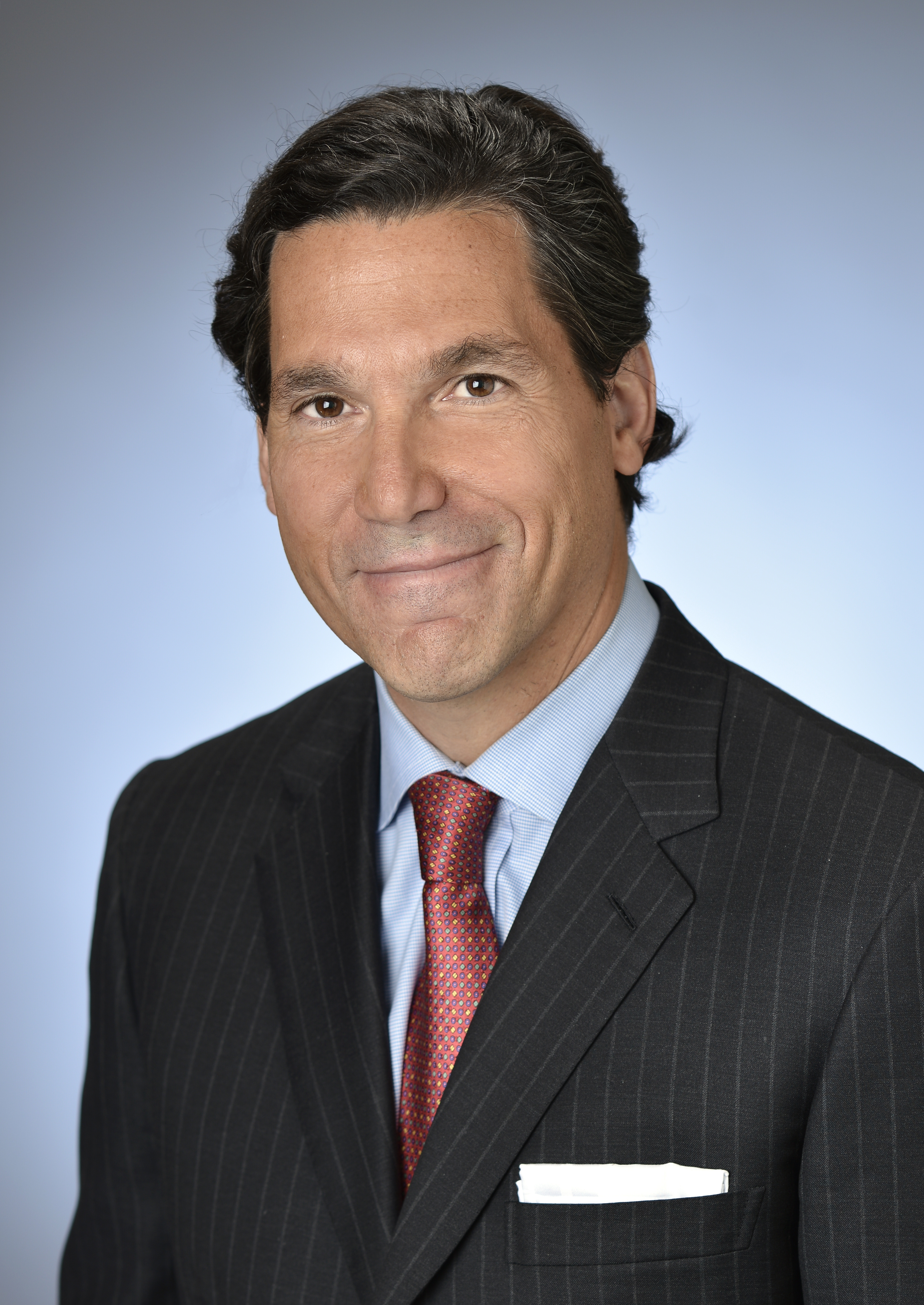
Mathew Rosengart, Spears's attorney of choice appointed on July 14, 2021

On July 12, Spears was reportedly in talks with attorney Mathew S. Rosengart, a former federal prosecutor, about his potential appointment as her new counsel. On July 13, the American Civil Liberties Union filed an amicus brief in the case, in support of Spears's wish to choose her own attorney. The brief was filed alongside other 25 civil and disability organizations.

In a July 14 hearing, Penny approved the resignations of Bessemer Trust and attorney Sam Ingham. The court also granted Spears the right to select her own attorney, Mathew Rosengart. Rosengart informed the court that he would be working to terminate the conservatorship. Spears spoke in the hearing, reportedly breaking down in tears when she described further abuses under the conservatorship. Spears called the alleged mistreatment "cruelty", and claimed that she "thought they were trying to kill [her]". Spears said she wanted her father removed as conservator, and that she intends to charge him with conservatorship abuse. Later that day, Spears publicly endorsed the #FreeBritney movement for the first time, using the hashtag in a caption on an Instagram post. Spears said that she felt "blessed" after earning "real representation", referring to Penny's decision to allow her to choose her own counsel.

On July 26, Rosengart filed a petition seeking to remove Jamie as conservator of Spears's estate and to replace him with Jason Rubin, a CPA at Certified Strategies Inc. in Woodland Hills, California. The petition made several claims of mismanagement against Jamie, namely money laundering his daughter's earnings and signing contracts on her behalf. The petition also included declarations of support from Montgomery and Lynne. The former stated on behalf of Spears's medical team that it was in her health's best interest to withdraw Jamie from overseeing her estate. The latter disclosed that Jamie hired a sports enhancement doctor, whom he encouraged to prescribe lithium to their daughter. Lynne further alleged that Jamie enlisted Spears's household staff to spy on her and report back to him.

On August 5, Rosengart filed a petition on an ex parte basis asking the court to expedite the subsequent hearing to August 23, or immediately suspend Jamie from his duties. He also highlighted further instances of racketeering on Jamie's part, namely diverting $300,000 from his daughter's estate to her former business manager Lou Taylor without her consent.

On August 6, Jamie filed a petition disputing Rosengart's claims, attributing his daughter's allegations of abuse to her being "mentally sick". Jamie also accused Montgomery and Sam Ingham of involuntarily admitting Spears into a medical facility in 2019. He further alleged that during a phone call Montgomery made to him the previous month, she expressed concerns regarding Spears's mental health, and raised the prospect of placing her under a 5150 hold. Later that day, Montgomery's attorney, Lauriann Wright, issued a statement in response to Jamie's filing.

Wright clarified that neither a (at the time) care manager, nor a court appointed counsel, have the "power or authority" to place a conservatee in a facility, and that her client's involvement was restricted to signing "routine paperwork" under Jamie's direction. She also divulged the decision to send Spears to the facility was made by her treating psychiatrist at the time, Dr. Timothy Benson. In regards to the details about Montgomery's phone call with Jamie, Wright denied that her client ever qualified Spears for a 5150 hold, and instead suggested that she not testify in court, or be subject to an evaluation.

On August 8, Penny denied Rosengart's petition to advance the hearing scheduled for September 29, as well as Jamie's immediate suspension. Four days later, Jamie filed a petition opposing his suspension and removal as conservator of the estate, though he agreed to step down at the request of Penny. In his filing, Jamie also disputed Lynne's declarations of support in favor of his removal, claiming misinformation on her behalf, in addition to accusing her of enriching herself financially from the estate, while citing her relationship with their daughter as "estranged".

==== Termination filings amid alleged battery and engagement ====
On August 23, it was reported Spears was under investigation following an altercation with a housekeeper, who did not return with her dogs after a veterinarian visit due to concerns of neglect. Spears reported a theft to the Ventura County Sheriff's Office, but did not pursue further action. When the housekeeper showed Spears a photo of her ill dog, she forcibly removed the phone from their hand, suspecting the pets had been taken by order of her father. The housekeeper reported the incident, but Spears refused to speak with officers. Rosengart issued a statement in Spears's defense, saying the incident was "sensational tabloid fodder" and "nothing more than a 'he said, she said' regarding a cell phone, with no striking and obviously no injury whatsoever". Spears's dogs were eventually returned, and no charges were filed.

On August 31, Rosengart accused Jamie of attempted extortion of approximately $2 million, including $1.3 million in attorneys's fees, $500,000 to Tri Star, and additional sums to Jamie himself. Rosengart declared he would not negotiate Jamie's departure, instead formally requesting Penny order Jamie's removal at the next hearing. Rosengart added that extortion negotiations were a "non-starter".

On September 7, Jamie reversed his position on the conservatorship, filing a petition to terminate, stating that "circumstances have changed" and adding that "all he wants is what is best for his daughter". Rosengart described the filing as "vindication" for Spears, but that he would "continue to explore all options" in investigating the alleged abuses that occurred under the conservatorship, including "misconduct" and "financial mismanagement". It was later revealed in court filings that the reversal was made after Spears's team requested discovery and deposition.

On September 12, Spears announced her engagement to Sam Asghari. On September 14, after a post in support of #FreeBritney, Spears's Instagram account was deactivated; she later clarified that she wanted to step away from social media to "celebrate [her] engagement". Spears returned to Instagram on September 20. On September 22, Spears and her legal team filed documents consenting to Jamie's petition to terminate. However, the filing also asked that Jamie be removed first, citing the "Kafkaesque nightmare" of his tenure as conservator, and arguing that Spears's prenuptial agreement with Asghari would involve the conservator of the estate, which Spears wanted to avoid.

==== Surveillance allegations and additional documentaries ====
On September 24, The New York Times released Controlling Britney Spears, a sequel to Framing Britney Spears, presenting undisclosed details regarding the conservatorship and Spears's management. The film made substantial allegations against Jamie, Black Box Security, Lou Taylor, and Robin Greenhill. Former head of wardrobe Tish Yates alleged that, under conservatorship, disputes between Spears and her superiors often "escalated" into threats regarding custody of her children. Yates and Felicia Culotta, Spears's former assistant, also alleged that Spears's inner circle was reduced, with Culotta expressing she believed management attempted to turn Spears against her.

Alex Vlasov of Black Box alleged that security administered medication to Spears. Her devices were surveilled and her phone conversations were mirrored, including those with Sam Ingham, potentially violating attorney-client privilege. Devices were placed in her bedroom that recorded conversations between her and Asghari or her children. Spears's romantic relationships were monitored, and significant others were required to sign non-disclosure agreements. The Times could not confirm if the court knew of these measures; Rosengart stated that they would be "fully and aggressively investigated", and would add in court filings that "Mr. Spears has crossed unfathomable lines". Vlasov stated that the measures implemented were "ethically [...] just one big mess", alleging that he was asked to destroy evidence.

On September 26, CNN aired a special report on the dispute. Former promotional manager Dan George, who had also appeared in Controlling Britney Spears, repeated the allegations detailed in the film; he added that Spears "could only read Christian books". George also said that those who were willing to question the conservatorship "could lose [their] job". The report alleged that Spears blamed Lou Taylor for many of the abuses surrounding the conservatorship.

On September 28, Netflix released Britney vs Spears, a documentary featuring Culotta, Rolling Stone journalist Jenny Eliscu, Adnan Ghalib, Sam Lutfi, and others. The film features leaked documents that director Erin Lee Carr claimed to have verified. Among the allegations, Ghalib shared texts that showed Spears's discontent with the conservatorship, and Lutfi denied claims he had given Spears drugs. When questioned about Lou Taylor, Culotta said "I will not touch that one [...] She will chew me up and spit me out". The film also included testimony from geriatric psychiatrist J. Edward Spar, who refused to say if he had examined Spears, though his name appeared on medical documents in 2008.

The same day, Jamie filed documents opposing his replacement as conservator of the estate by John Zabel, Spears's candidate. He argued Zabel was not a "licensed fiduciary" and therefore "not well suited" to conserve Spears's $60 million estate. Rosengart defended Zabel's record in a separate filing.

==== Suspension and termination of conservatorship ====
On September 29, Penny suspended Jamie Spears as conservator of the estate, effectively ending his control of Spears's life after 13 years. He was replaced by Zabel, who received all documents regarding the estate. Penny reportedly based her decision on a "situation [that was] not tenable". On October 3, Spears thanked the #FreeBritney movement for "constant resilience" in spreading awareness.

On October 15, Jamie's half-sister Leigh Ann Spears Wrather criticized his involvement in the conservatorship, calling him "barbaric", and expressing that he should be "held accountable". She alleged that Lynne did little to support Spears in the dispute. The same day, Spears in a since-deleted Instagram post explicitly accused Lynne and Taylor of orchestrating the conservatorship alongside Jamie, expressing that they collectively "[knew] exactly what [they] did" in regard to its establishment.

On November 3, Lynne requested that Spears's estate pay more than $600,000 in legal fees, arguing that they were "warranted" because they were used to support Spears's best interests. The same day, Jamie again petitioned for "immediate termination" of the conservatorship, stating that his actions were in Spears's best interests. On November 5, Lou Taylor on behalf of Tri Star denied various allegations, including those of surveillance and medical treatment, that media had described.

On November 12, the conservatorship of both the person and the estate of Spears, which had lasted for nearly 14 years, was terminated by Judge Penny, and there were no objections to the ruling. A mental evaluation was not needed. Assets overseen by the conservatorship were moved to a trust. Spears called it the "best day ever" in a tweet after the termination. Court filings from November 2 revealed the investigations that Spears's legal team intended to pursue post-termination, including investigative efforts into the financials of the conservatorship, the Black Box surveillance claims, and alleged connections with Lou Taylor, Robin Greenhill, and Tri Star.

== Effects ==
The publicity surrounding Spears's case led to increased discussions about conservatorship abuse. Dubbed "the Britney effect" by many sources, her legal battle is often considered to have brought greater attention to an already controversial subject in legal contexts. Other sources pointed out that, despite such discussions, Spears's situation was still "atypical" compared to other conservatorships due to her celebrity and wealth.

According to The Guardian in 2021, 1.3 million Americans were under conservatorship. The article referenced a 2005 investigation by the Los Angeles Times that found many cases where elders would be placed under "for-profit conservators", and a 2018 report by the National Council on Disability which found that conservatorships are often implemented without considering less restrictive options. The source also described how criticism of conservatorship law has been a part of disability rights advocacy since the 1960s.

In 2021, NPR reported that conservatorships are often difficult to end, with the "burden" of termination being on the conservatee and legal counsel being able to "prove" a lack of necessity. The article also highlighted that conservatorships are often established to last indefinitely.

The American Civil Liberties Union (ACLU) regularly voiced their support for Spears. Zoe Brennan-Krohn of the ACLU Disability Rights Project stated that Spears was "only one of untold thousands nationwide" at risk for guardianship or conservatorship abuse. The organization has supported alternatives to conservatorship, including supported decision-making, that prevent the loss of civil rights. The Christian Science Monitor found that such alternatives are often "glossed over" by legal experts and argued that solutions would be most effective as legislation; other sources in the judicial field argue for greater oversight of conservatorship cases and changes in funding.

=== Legislative efforts ===
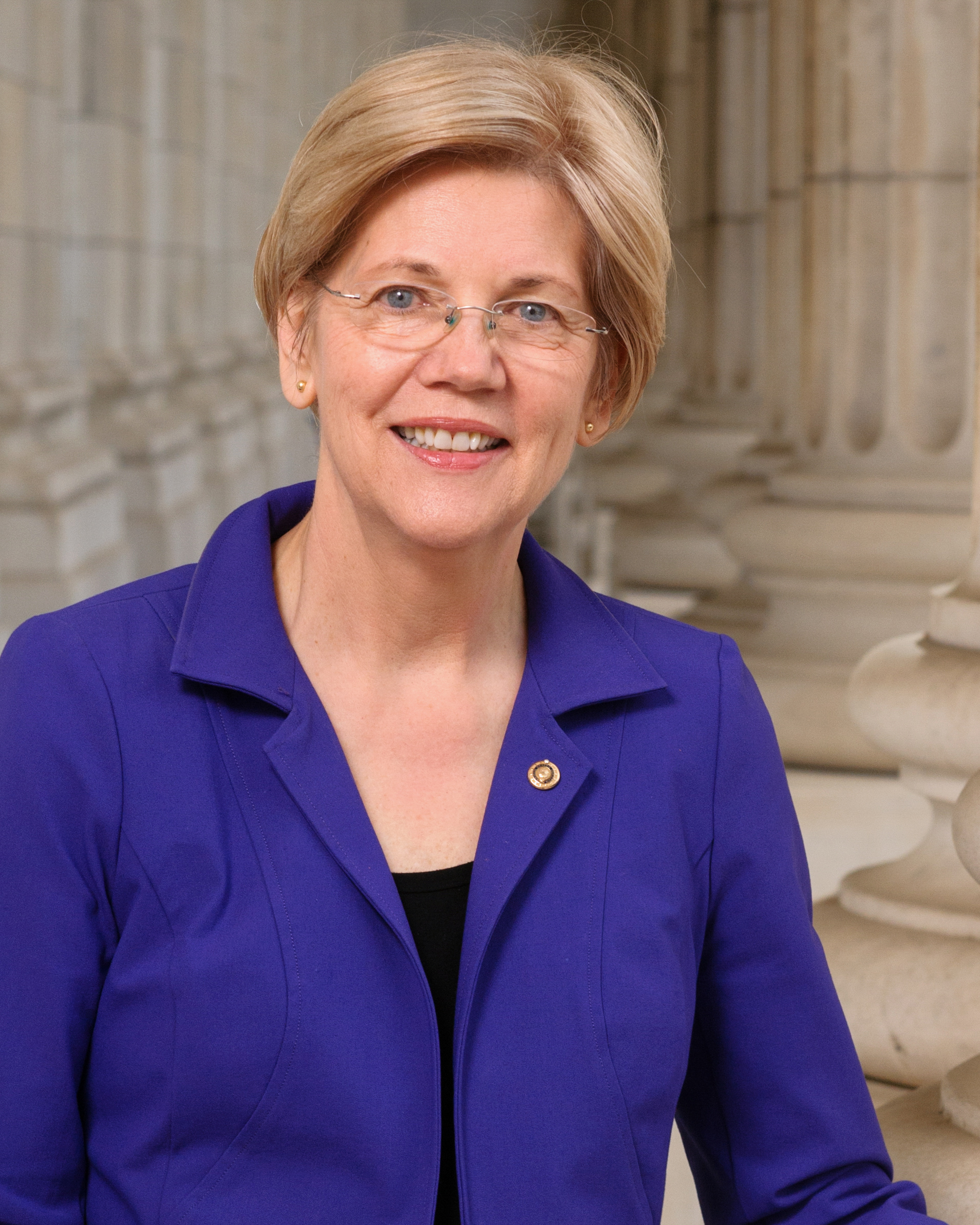
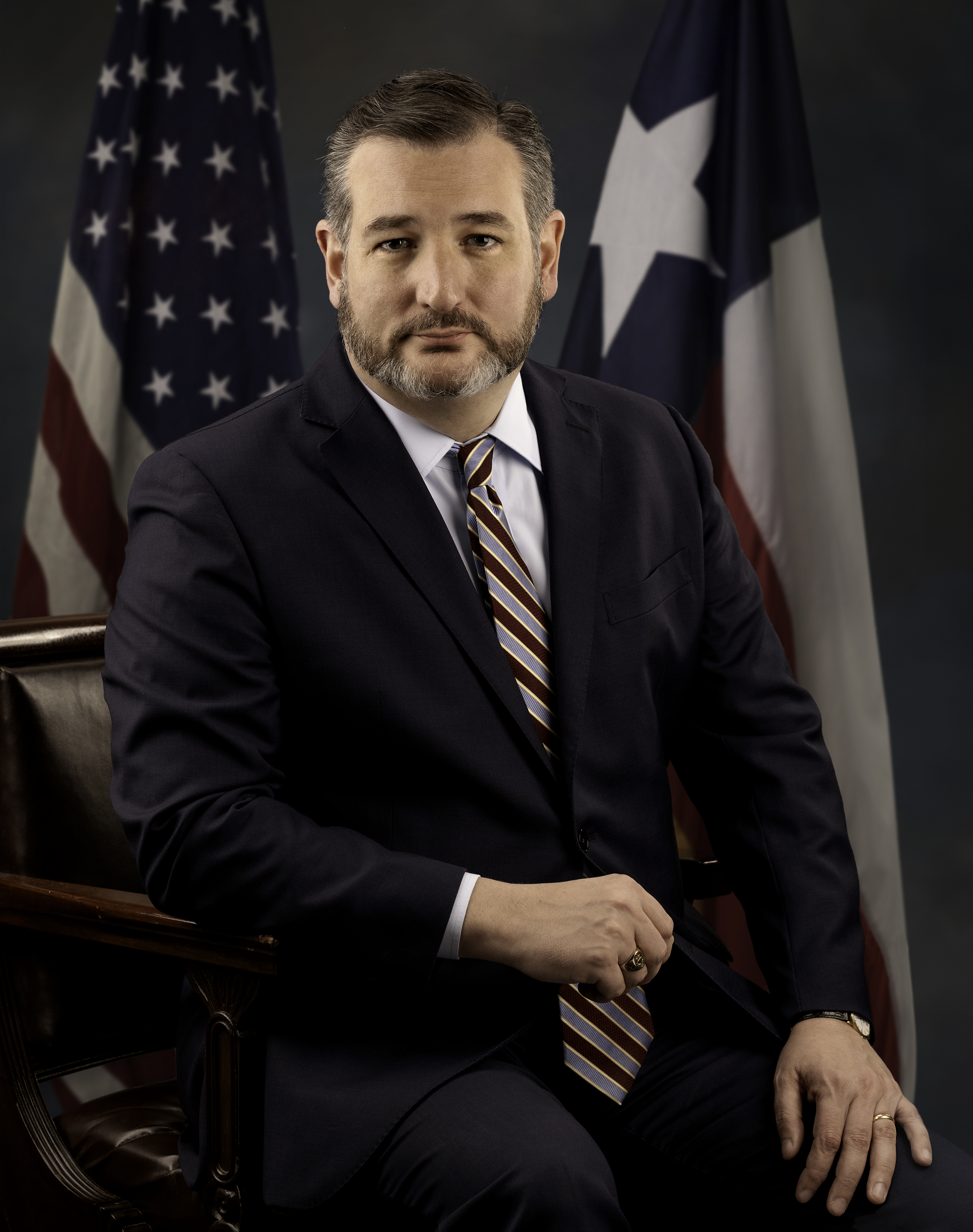
U.S. Senators Elizabeth Warren (left) and Ted Cruz (right) were prominent legislators that supported Spears and criticized conservatorship abuse.

Legislation spurred by the public dispute has been discussed within the U.S. at the federal and state levels, and concern is often described as bipartisan. On March 8, 2021, Representatives Matt Gaetz (R–FL) and Jim Jordan (R–OH) requested Rep. Jerry Nadler (D–NY) for a hearing on conservatorship abuse within the House Judiciary Committee. In the letter, Gaetz and Jordan stated about conservatorship abuse that "the most striking example is perhaps the case of multi-platinum performing artist Britney Spears".

In light of Spears's June 23 testimony, Senators Elizabeth Warren (D–MA) and Bob Casey (D–PA) requested information from the Department of Health and Human Services and the Department of Justice on guardianship. The senators expressed their concern that guardianship systems could "create significant opportunities for neglect, exploitation, and abuse", and highlighted that insufficient data hindered "policy recommendations". The letter to the agencies added that Spears's case "has shined a light on longstanding concerns [...] for financial and civil rights abuses of individuals placed under [...] conservatorship".

On July 1, Representatives Gaetz, Marjorie Taylor Greene (R–GA), Burgess Owens (R–UT), and Andy Biggs (R–AZ) invited Spears to testify in Congress about her case. Gaetz said that a testimony could "inform policy decisions". The letter, signed only by Republicans, stated that Congress "should be inspired to bipartisan action".

On July 20, Representatives Charlie Crist (D–FL) and Nancy Mace (R–SC) introduced the Freedom and Right to Emancipate from Exploitation Act, dubbed the FREE Act, which would give conservatees the right to petition for their own legal guardian, implement oversight policies, and require states to provide guardianship statistics.

On September 28, Senators Richard Blumenthal (D–CT) and Ted Cruz (R–TX) held a bipartisan hearing in the Senate Judiciary Subcommittee on conservatorships. The senators cited Spears's case as a major influence of the hearing, which was named "Toxic Conservatorships: The Need for Reform", in reference to Spears's 2004 hit single "Toxic". Spears did not testify in the hearing, but various legal and medical experts alongside other conservatees did.

==== California ====
On February 19, 2021, California State Senator Ben Allen introduced Senate Bill 724, which would give conservatees the right to obtain counsel as they choose, regardless of mental capacity. SB-724 received publicity largely in part because of the connection to Spears's failed attempts at retaining counsel in Adam Streisand in 2008.

On September 30, California Governor Gavin Newsom signed the #FreeBritney Bill into law after "unanimous" support. The bill, drafted by Assemblyman Evan Low, implements procedures that check for financial conflict of interest, termination reform, and financial penalties for abusive conservators. The bill's provisions went into effect in 2023.

On January 20, 2022, advocacy groups announced support for legislation drafted by Assemblyman Brian Maienschein. The bill would require judges to consider less restrictive alternatives for individuals before conservatorship, and implement further reform of termination procedures.

== Responses ==
=== Spears's family ===
In September 2022, Spears's former husband Kevin Federline said in an interview with 60 Minutes, that he 100 percent believed the conservatorship saved her life, saying: "I feel like he [Jamie] saved her back then." Spears's son Jayden Federline stated in the same interview that Jamie Spears had good intentions, saying: "He was trying to be like any father, like, pursue his daughter's dream of being a superstar, working and doing all these concerts and performing. But I think some people are just, like, ceasing to realize how much he cares about her."

Jamie Spears has not given interviews or made comments about the conservatorship, except in December 2022, when he told UK's The Mail on Sunday: "Not everybody's going to agree with me. It's been one hell of a time. But I love my daughter with all my heart and soul. Where would Britney be right now without that conservatorship? And I don't know if she'd be alive. I don't. For protecting her, and also protecting the kids, conservatorship was a great tool. Without it, I don't think she would have got the kids back." Jamie stated that he wanted to ensure that Spears's children saw their mother, saying: "We could take the kids to Europe. They didn't miss time with their mother. They didn't miss time with their father. Not many people knew that. The main purpose was to get Britney back with her kids in a comfortable relationship. We did everything in the world with them. My relationship with Kevin gave them a sense of peace, and of protection. Kevin will tell you this too – it was us who raised the kids. I just did what I was supposed to do, or felt like I needed to do."

In January 2023, Spears's former fiancé and co-conservator Jason Trawick discussed the conservatorship on Kevin Connolly's podcast, saying: "Listen, did she need a conservatorship when I was there? Yes. I'll be the first to say it. I think she needed some guidance." Trawick said that Spears' father Jamie meant well and the conservatorship was there for her own good, adding: "I don't know if it should have ended earlier or later, but it shouldn't have ended when I was there." Trawick thought that the conservatorship was in place not just for finances, but for therapy, structure and to stop her from seeing "certain individuals were not great for her to be in her life."

=== #FreeBritney ===
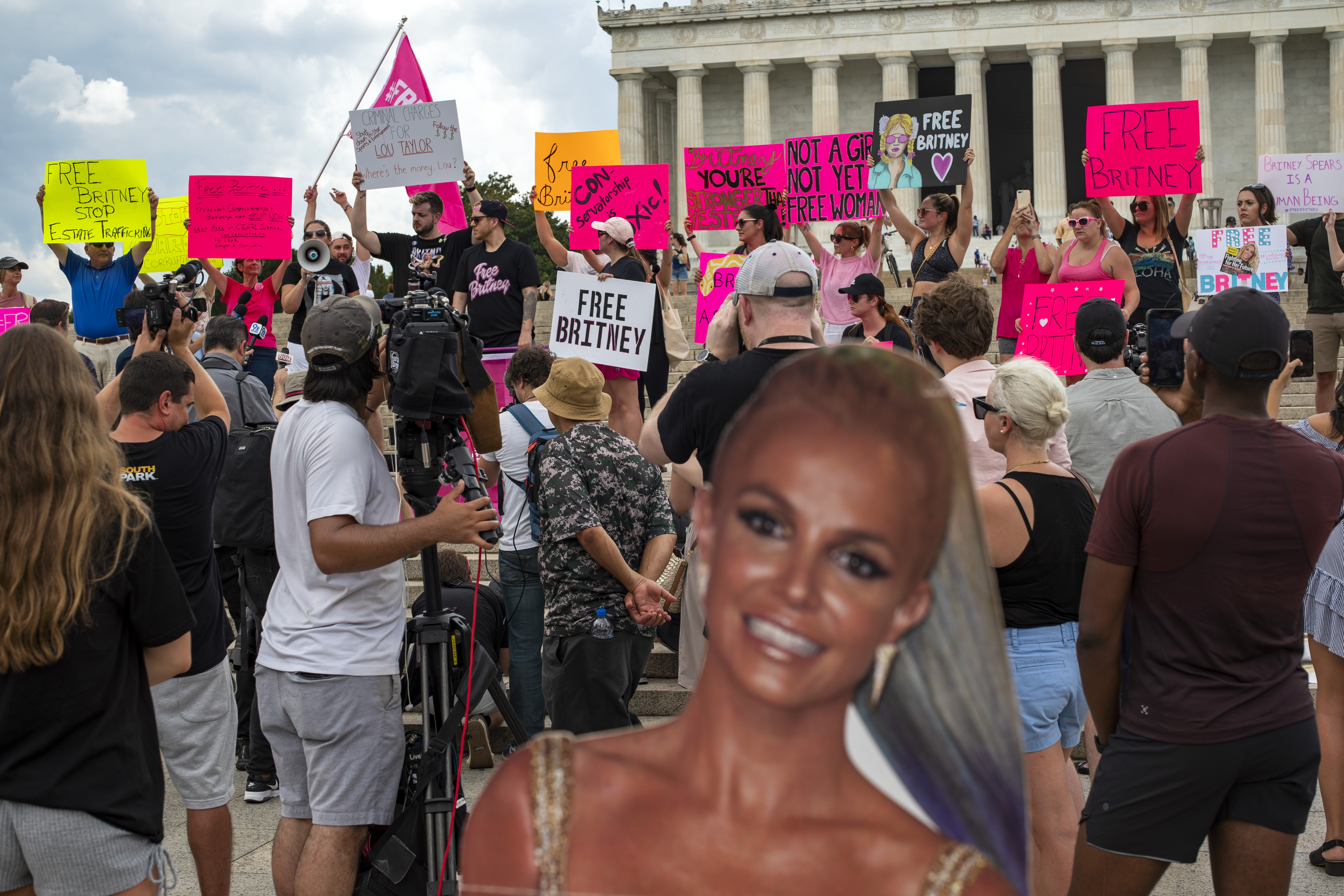
A #FreeBritney rally at the Lincoln Memorial in Washington, D.C., on July 14, 2021

In response to the conservatorship, some of Spears's fans advocated for its termination. Though the term "Free Britney" had existed since 2009, fans began using it in the hashtag "#FreeBritney" in 2019 to advocate for Spears after her career hiatus and mental facility stay. The movement's stated goal was "ending the conservatorship of Britney Spears", as seen on their website. The movement claimed that Spears had been denied her basic human rights under the arrangement and that Spears's team had profited from the conservatorship. The movement also claims to raise awareness of conservatorship abuse. Members of the movement organized in-person and virtual rallies, which took place in West Hollywood City Hall, Stanley Mosk Courthouse, and Grand Park in Los Angeles, California.

As a result of the COVID-19 pandemic, after 2019, most advocacy shifted online to social media platforms such as TikTok, Twitter, and Instagram, where hashtag trends like #FreeBritney and #BritneySpeaks were popularized, with the videoconferencing program Zoom also being used. The movement was initially criticized by the media, fact-checkers, and the conservators for spreading conspiracy theories about Spears's situation.

In September 2021, the documentary film Controlling Britney Spears alleged that Spears's conservators, management, and security investigated the movement in its early days and documented details regarding early activists under the guise of Spears's "protection". Efforts to investigate the movement allegedly included undercover operations. Activism in the movement spread beyond California and was present globally; rallies were held in Washington, D.C. and London, England. In September 2021, hashtag campaigns occurred on the Chinese social media platforms Weibo and WeChat. On the former, the hashtag #FreeBritney reached 130 million views.

After the termination of the conservatorship, Spears thanked the movement for "saving [her] life", expressing that it raised awareness of her situation amidst her limited ability to voice her discontent with the arrangement.

=== Lawmakers ===
After Spears's June 23 testimony, a bipartisan group of lawmakers within Congress voiced their criticism of the conservatorship arrangement. These included members of the House Judiciary Committee, alongside Senator Ted Cruz, and Representatives Nancy Mace (R-SC), Carolyn Maloney (D-NY), and Barbara Lee (D-CA). Many of their criticisms were rooted in Spears's allegations of reproductive coercion. Senate Majority Leader Chuck Schumer (D-NY), Representatives Gaetz, Barry Moore (R-AL), Seth Moulton (D-MA), and Jim Banks (R-IN), as well as politicians Tulsi Gabbard and Caitlyn Jenner voiced their support in the following days. Gaetz appeared and spoke at a #FreeBritney rally on July 14.

Support for Spears from lawmakers has also come from outside the United States. On July 3, in support of the #FreeBritney movement and Gay Pride Month, the building housing the Brazilian National Congress was lit with the colors of the Pride flag and letters spelling the phrase "Free Britney". After Jamie's suspension on September 29, New Zealand politician David Seymour released a statement in support of Spears on behalf of the ACT Party.

=== Entertainment industry ===
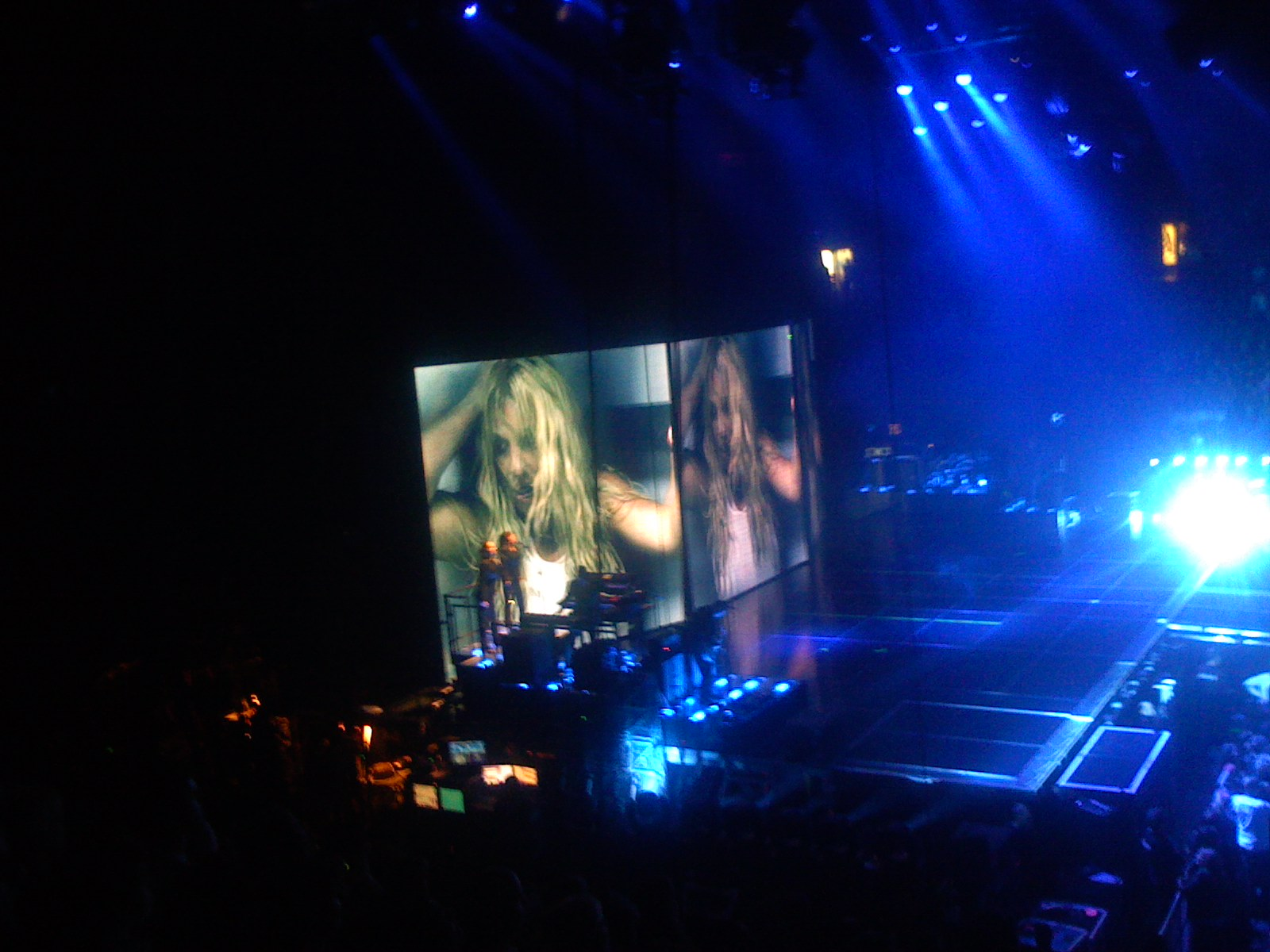
Spears pictured locked in elevator during a backdrop of Madonna's Sticky & Sweet Tour (2008–2009)

Numerous entertainment industry figures have voiced their support and concern over Spears during the conservatorship dispute, with some explicitly advocating for the #FreeBritney movement. These include Miley Cyrus, JWoww, Tess Holliday, Hayley Kiyoko, Lisa Rinna, and Eve; alongside Bella Thorne, Snooki, Ariel Winter, Taryn Manning, Paris Hilton, Tinashe, Cher, Rose McGowan, Cardi B, Missy Elliott, Lindsay Lohan, Raven-Symoné, Courtney Love, and Jeffree Star. During the 2008 Sticky & Sweet Tour, Madonna voiced her support for Spears, who made a cameo on the song "Human Nature".

In direct response to the documentary, Framing Britney Spears, the following individuals spoke out in support of Spears: Sarah Jessica Parker, Charlie Puth, Sharon Stone, Garbage, Bette Midler, Andy Cohen, Christina Milian, Valerie Bertinelli, Tamron Hall, Ellie Goulding, Hayley Williams, Sam Smith, Kacey Musgraves, Liz Phair, Vanessa Carlton, Amber Tamblyn, Lucy Hale, Sam Asghari, and Christian Siriano.

After the June 23 testimony, additional celebrities voiced support for Spears and the #FreeBritney movement, including Meghan McCain, Mariah Carey, Brandy, Halsey, Jesse Tyler Ferguson, Michelle Visage, Justin Timberlake, and Christina Aguilera. Late-night television hosts Stephen Colbert and Bill Maher also voiced support for Spears during their programs in the days after the testimony. Spears's sister Jamie Lynn Spears, her Zoey 101 co-stars Paul Butcher and Alexa Nikolas, and ex-husband Kevin Federline also spoke out to support Britney.

In July 2021, more individuals spoke in support of Spears, including first ex-husband Jason Alexander, former associate Sam Lutfi, family friend Jaqueline Butcher, Iggy Azalea, Elon Musk, will.i.am, AJ McLean, Dolly Parton, and Ariana Grande. Also that month, Spears hired an entertainment lawyer, Mathew S. Rosengart, to represent her in her legal battle against her father. Rosengart previously represented actor Sean Penn in a successful defamation case against filmmaker Lee Daniels. In September, Rosie O'Donnell voiced her support for Spears in a CNN report on the conservatorship, stating that she tried to reach out to Spears on multiple occasions. That month, Jimmy Kimmel also commented on the case. In October, Spears also received support from Olivia Rodrigo and Adele.

Other celebrity conservatorships facing similar scrutiny are those of actresses Amanda Bynes and Nichelle Nichols. Nichols's conservatorship dispute has been discussed at #FreeBritney rallies.

=== Film and television examinations ===
The conservatorship dispute has been examined in multiple documentary films and television episodes. These include MTV's Britney: For the Record (2008), the Emmy–nominated New York Times documentary Framing Britney Spears (2021), and the BBC's The Battle for Britney: Fans, Cash and a Conservatorship (2021). On September 24, 2021, The New York Times released a follow-up documentary to Framing Britney Spears, titled Controlling Britney Spears, as another part of their FX and Hulu series The New York Times Presents. A feature-length Netflix documentary, titled Britney vs Spears, was released on September 28, 2021. The 2020 Netflix film I Care a Lot, starring Rosamund Pike, Peter Dinklage, and Eiza González, involves a conservator "crafting a devious system of financial and emotional exploitation"; the film's premise has often been likened to Spears's situation. Similarly, Spears's alleged exploitation and abuse within the conservatorship has been compared to events taking place in the episode "Rachel, Jack and Ashley Too" of the Black Mirror anthology series, starring Miley Cyrus.
