= Jamie Spears =

Father of Britney Spears (born 1952)

- Born: James Parnell Spears; June 6, 1952 (age 74); Kentwood, Louisiana, U.S.
- Education: Kentwood High School
- Occupation: Construction business owner
- Spouses: Debbie Sanders (m. 1972; div. 1975) Lynne Bridges (m. 1976; div. 2002)
- Children: Bryan; Britney; Jamie Lynn

James Parnell "Jamie" Spears (born June 6, 1952) (Note: Official sources stated he was born on June 6, 1952. Other sources claim he was born in 1953.) is an American retired construction business owner. He is the father of Bryan Spears, Britney Spears, and Jamie Lynn Spears.

== Early life ==
James Parnell Spears was born to June Austin Spears (1930–2012), and Emma Jean Spears (née Forbes) (1934–1966). When Jamie was five years old, his mother gave birth to his younger brother Austin, who died after only three days. After Austin's death, his mother attempted suicide on three occasions. Despite obstacles established by the early tragedy, James did well in school, and in the eighth grade, made the honor roll at Kentwood High School.

When James was only 14 years old, his mother Emma, who had been struggling to overcome the loss of her son Austin, left their family home in Kentwood, resulting in her being declared missing. Emma arrived at Roberts Cemetery, the burial place of Austin, in nearby Osyka, Mississippi around 3:30pm on Sunday, May 29, 1966. Her body was found by a caretaker around 10:30am on Monday, May 30, at the grave of Austin. According to the coroner, J.L. Glover, Emma had aimed a 12-gauge shotgun at her chest and pulled the trigger with the big-toe of her right-foot.

James also survived a car accident that killed a football teammate aged 17. His upbringing was difficult, as his daughter Jamie Lynn wrote in her memoir: Spears, Jamie Lynn (2022). Things I Should Have Said. "Learning about my father's childhood helped me understand him better. Daddy's upbringing was difficult. My grandfather, Paw-Paw June, was a physical man who used his hands to solve problems. Maw-Maw Jean was a good woman in a difficult situation. In those days women didn't leave their husbands. When Daddy was fourteen, his baby brother died, and soon after so did his mother. Paw-Paw June eventually married Maw-Maw Ruth, but Great-Granny Lexie, Jean's mother, took part in raising Daddy too. Despite the women's efforts, my father was raised by an abusive father who made unreasonable demands of his son in all aspects of his life. Daddy was forced to practice sports for hours at a time—past the point of exhaustion. For basketball, Paw-Paw June made Daddy shoot one hundred shots after practice. Daddy loved basketball, but his father made him abandon the court for the football field. He followed his father’s directive to play college football, knowing all along he would have been much more impactful as a basketball player."

== Career ==
In the mid-1970s, Spears worked as a welder and boilermaker. In the 1980s, Spears ran a successful construction business, and he and Lynne decided to build and own a health and wellness spa. He became well known for developing businesses, including the first gym in their area in Louisiana.

In Jamie Lynn's memoir Things I Should Have Said, she claimed her father "...had a seafood restaurant called Granny's, known for crawfish and shrimp. At some point he gave it to Bryan, who eventually sold it." The restaurant, which was located at 401 3rd Street in Kentwood, LA, was actually owned by James' maternal grandmother Lexie Mae Thompson-Pierce. In March 1993, Lexie Mae by "Act of Donation" gave Bryan Spears the land the restaurant was situated on valued at an estimated $20,000.

=== Conservatorship controversy ===
Spears came to prominence as a public figure in 2019 with the rise of a movement to terminate his daughter's conservatorship, dubbed #FreeBritney. This movement garnered support from a number of celebrities, including Cher, Paris Hilton, and Miley Cyrus, as well as the nonprofit organization American Civil Liberties Union. On April 22, 2019, fans protested outside the West Hollywood City Hall to demand Britney's release from the psychiatric facility where she had been staying since Spears's illness in January.

During a May 2019 hearing, Judge Brenda Penny ordered "an expert evaluation" of the conservatorship. In September 2019, Britney's ex-husband Kevin Federline obtained a restraining order against Spears following an alleged physical altercation between Spears and one of Britney's sons. Britney's longtime care manager, Jodi Montgomery, temporarily replaced Spears as her conservator of the person on September 10, 2019. In the same month, a hearing resulted in "no decisions made" about the conservatorship arrangement.

In August 2020, Spears called the #FreeBritney movement "a joke" and its organizers "conspiracy theorists". On August 17, 2020, Britney's court-appointed lawyer submitted a court filing that documented her desire to have her conservatorship altered to reflect "her current lifestyle and her stated wishes", to instate Montgomery as her permanent conservator, and to replace Spears with "a qualified corporate fiduciary" as conservator of her estate. Four days later, Judge Penny extended the established arrangement until February 2021. In November 2020, Judge Penny approved Bessemer Trust as co-conservator with Spears of his daughter's estate. A documentary focusing over his daughter's career and Spears's conservatorship over her, Framing Britney Spears, premiered on FX in February 2021. The same month, Jamie Spears' lawyer Vivian L. Thoreen spoke to Good Morning America in her client's defense, saying that she understands "that every story needs a villain, but people have it so wrong here. This is a story about a fiercely loving, dedicated, and loyal father who rescued his daughter from a life-threatening situation. People were harming her and they were exploiting her. Jamie saved Britney’s life."

On June 23, 2021, Britney gave testimony regarding her father, stating that he sent her to a rehab and mental facility against her will in January 2019. She also stated that she is afraid of him and that he has committed "conservatorship abuse". Britney said he should not be able to walk away and that he should go to jail for his actions. On September 7, 2021, Spears filed a petition to end the conservatorship over his daughter. Judge Brenda Penny suspended Spears as conservator on September 29, 2021. On November 12, 2021, the conservatorship was terminated by Judge Penny following Britney's public testimony in which she accused her management team and family of abuse.

In September 2022, Britney's former husband Kevin Federline said in an interview with 60 Minutes, that he 100 percent believed the conservatorship saved her life, saying: "When Jamie took over (the conservatorship), things got into order. He saved her life." Spears' grandson Jayden Federline stated in the same interview that his grandfather only had good intentions, saying: "He was trying to be like any father, like, pursue his daughter’s dream of being a superstar, working and doing all these concerts and performing. But I think some people are just, like, ceasing to realize how much he cares about her." Spears has not given interviews, except in December 2022, when he told British newspaper The Mail on Sunday: "Not everybody's going to agree with me. It's been one hell of a time. But I love my daughter with all my heart and soul. Where would Britney be right now without that conservatorship? And I don't know if she'd be alive. I don’t. For protecting her, and also protecting the kids, conservatorship was a great tool. Without it, I don't think she would have got the kids back."

In January 2023, Britney's former fiancé and co-conservator Jason Trawick discussed the conservatorship on Kevin Connolly's podcast, saying: "Listen, did she need a conservatorship when I was there? Yes. I'll be the first to say it. I think she needed some guidance." Trawick said that Jamie meant well and the conservatorship was there for Britney's own good, adding: "I don't know if it should have ended earlier or later, but it shouldn't have ended when I was there." Trawick thought that the conservatorship was in place not just for finances, but for therapy, structure and to stop her from seeing "certain individuals were not great for her to be in her life."

== Personal life ==
Spears' first wife was Debbie Sanders, who remains his friend. In July 1976, he married his second wife, Lynne Bridges. She filed for divorce in 1980, requesting a temporary restraining order, fearing that he would "become angry when he is served with these papers" and harass or harm her, "especially if he has been drinking alcoholic beverages, as he has done in the past." However, they reconciled, and Britney was born the following year.

Jamie and Lynne Spears divorced in May 2002 and reconciled without remarrying around 2010. They were seen still united in 2014, but were evidently completely separated by 2020. They have three children: son Bryan James (born 1977) and daughters Britney Jean (born 1981) and Jamie Lynn (born 1991). They also have five grandchildren.

Spears struggled with alcohol later in life and eventually went to rehab in 2004. He suffered a near-fatal colon rupture in November 2018. Spears underwent emergency surgery and was hospitalized for 28 days. In October 2023, People magazine reported that Spears was hospitalized with a bacterial infection, and has been recovering in an infectious disease outpatient facility. In December 2023, it was reported that one of his legs was amputated due to infection.

== Filmography ==
Year	Title	Role	Notes
2008	Britney: For the Record	Himself	Documentary film
2013	I Am Britney Jean	Himself	Documentary film
2016	Jamie Lynn Spears: When the Lights Go Out	Himself	Documentary film
