= Bryan Spears =

American film and television producer (born 1977)

- Born: Bryan James Spears; April 19, 1977 (age 49); McComb, Mississippi, U.S.
- Education: Parklane Academy; Southeastern Louisiana University
- Occupations: Film and television producer
- Spouse: Graciella Sanchez (m. 2008; div. 2017)
- Children: 1
- Parents: Jamie Spears (father); Lynne Spears (mother)
- Relatives: Britney Spears (sister); Jamie Lynn Spears (sister)

Bryan James Spears (born April 19, 1977) is an American film and television producer. He is the older brother of singer Britney Spears and actress Jamie Lynn Spears, and was co-manager of Britney's conservatorship. He is the first child and the only son of Jamie Spears and Lynne Spears. He was a co-producer of Nickelodeon's teen sitcom Zoey 101, which starred Jamie Lynn.

== Biography ==
Spears was born to Lynne Irene (née Bridges) and James "Jamie" Parnell Spears on April 19, 1977, in McComb, Mississippi. He was born with a bacterial lung infection and had to be hooked to an IV before overcoming the infection about a week later. In Lynne's book, Through the Storm: A Real Story of Fame and Family in a Tabloid World, she recalls how she thought Spears was going to die and pleaded with God to let him live.

Spears' father worked as a construction contractor and his mother worked as a second-grade teacher. The family attended First Baptist Church in Kentwood, Louisiana.

Spears attended Parklane Academy, a private Christian school in McComb that serves grades K-12. After graduating high school, Spears attended Southeastern Louisiana University in Hammond, his mother's alma mater. While attending university, he majored in kinesiology. In 2000, he studied sports administration at Southwest Mississippi Community College.

== Career ==
At age 22, he moved to New York City and began working for the Live Nation TV channel focusing on sports. After his sister Britney became famous, Spears started working as a manager for Spears family interests, including acting as producer for a number of Jamie Lynn’s projects. He was a co-producer of Nickelodeon's teen sitcom Zoey 101 and worked as an executive producer for two television specials about Jamie Lynn. Before his father Jamie gained conservatorship over Britney in 2008, Spears was paid $200,000 for "services rendered." Spears worked for his sister Britney on six of her world tours. He lived in Las Vegas for four years and worked with Britney during her concert residency. He directed Jamie Lynn's music video for the song "Sleepover" (2016).

His father Jamie owned a seafood restaurant called Granny’s in Louisiana, which he eventually gave to Bryan. He has since sold the restaurant.

== Personal life ==
In 2008, Spears married Graciella Sanchez, manager of Jamie Lynn and founder of One Talent Management. They wed in a small, private ceremony in New Orleans. Sanchez is a graduate of Yale University. They have one daughter together. Sanchez filed for divorce in August 2015. They got divorced in 2017.

Since February 2020, Spears has been dating Amber Lynn Conklin.

== Filmography ==
=== As himself ===
Year	Title	Role	Notes
2001	MTV Diary of Britney Spears	Himself	
2001	Total Britney Live	Himself	
2003	Britney Spears: Out All Night	Himself	
2004	Britney Spears: Greatest Hits – My Prerogative	Himself	Segment: "My Prerogative"; Uncredited
2005	Britney and Kevin: Chaotic	Himself	Episode: "Veil of Secrecy"
2008	Britney: For the Record	Himself	Documentary film; Uncredited
2013	I Am Britney Jean	Himself	Documentary film
2016	Jamie Lynn Spears: When the Lights Go Out	Himself	Documentary film

=== As producer or director ===
Year	Title	Role	Notes
2005– 2008	Zoey 101	Co–producer	25 episodes
2005	Jamie Lynn Spears: A Weekend with Jamie Lynn Spears	Executive producer	
2006	VideoNow: At Home with Jamie Lynn Spears	Executive producer	Television special
2006	Zoey 101: Spring Break-Up	Co–producer	
2016	"Sleepover"	Director	Music video by Jamie Lynn Spears
