= Framing Britney Spears =

2021 documentary television film

- Television release poster
- Directed by: Samantha Stark
- Starring: Britney Spears (archival footage); Dave Holmes; Wesley Morris; Felicia Culotta
- Music by: John E. Low
- Country of origin: United States
- Original language: English

Production
- Producers: Liz Day; Liz Hodes; Mary Robertson; Ken Druckerman; Jason Stallman; Sam Dolnick; Stephanie Preiss
- Cinematography: Emily Topper
- Editor: Geoff O'Brien
- Running time: 74 minutes
- Production companies: The New York Times Company; Left/Right Productions

Original release
- Network: FX
- Release: February 5, 2021

The New York Times Presents: Framing Britney Spears is a 2021 American documentary film directed by Samantha Stark, reported and produced by Liz Day, and produced by Liz Hodes, Mary Robertson, Jason Stallman, Sam Dolnick, Ken Druckerman and Stephanie Preiss. The documentary follows the life and career of American singer Britney Spears, her rise to fame as a global music superstar at age 16, her gratuitous and misogynistic treatment by the media and paparazzi, her highly publicized breakdown in 2007, the conservatorship that between 2008 and 2021 placed her involuntarily under the control of her father Jamie Spears, and the #FreeBritney movement sparked by Spears's fanbase.

The documentary was released on February 5, 2021 as an edition of The New York Times Presents on FX and FX on Hulu. Shortly after the documentary aired, a probate judge dismissed objections by Jamie regarding the co-conservatorship arrangement. The documentary garnered highly favorable reviews from critics, and widespread international media coverage, contributing to heightened mainstream public awareness of the conservatorship dispute and a reassessment of Spears' sexist and gratuitous treatment. The documentary won the TCA Award for Outstanding Achievement in News and Information, and received two nominations at the 73rd Primetime Creative Arts Emmy Awards, including for Outstanding Documentary or Nonfiction Special.

== Synopsis ==
In 2021, at age 39, Britney Spears, one of the world's most successful pop stars with an estimated net worth of $59 million, has remained legally under the control of her father Jamie Spears since 2008.

Framing Britney Spears re-examines Spears's career, her rise to fame, and personal struggles throughout her three decades in show business. Former Jive Records marketing executive Kim Kaiman, who helped cultivate Spears's image once she signed a recording contract, describes Jamie as being disconnected from his daughter's life and highly financially motivated. "The only thing Jamie ever said to me was 'My daughter's gonna be so rich, she's gonna buy me a boat'", Kaiman says.

Interviewers and paparazzi are shown at various times asking Spears sexist and distressing questions. Ivo Niehe, then 53, asked a 17-year-old Spears about her breasts and her thoughts about breast implants, adding, "You seem to get furious when a talkshow host comes up with this subject." In an interview following Spears's breakup with Justin Timberlake, Diane Sawyer accused her of mistreating Timberlake, driving Spears to tears, and of "upsetting a lot of mothers in this country" with her provocative music videos. The film alleges that Timberlake weaponized his breakup with Spears in the "Cry Me a River" music video, where the song's unfaithful girlfriend was portrayed as Spears, and in an interview where he enthusiastically claims he has had sex with her (contrary to Spears's claim that she was waiting until marriage).

The documentary also explores Spears's breakdown in 2007, and interviews paparazzo Daniel "Dano" Ramos who photographed Spears attacking his car with an umbrella moments after ex-husband Kevin Federline denied her visitation of her children. "She never gave a clue or information to us that, I don't appreciate you guys, leave me the eff alone," Ramos says, to which the director asks, "What about when she said, 'Leave me alone'?" It is alleged that Spears may have been suffering from postpartum depression at this time. Intrusive actions of the paparazzi are portrayed as exacerbating factors in her condition.

Spears's relationship with Sam Lutfi, who then identified himself as her new manager, is speculated in the film to be a turning point for her father to first negotiate a conservatorship and is described as "attaching himself to celebrities, often at vulnerable moments for them." The film explains that conservatorships are put in place for people who are unable to make their own decisions or are mentally incapacitated. Spears is shown working consistently throughout her conservatorship. It is alleged that Spears requested that the bank manage her estate rather than her father. Spears's longtime family friend and former assistant Felicia Culotta says she is baffled about the conservatorship arrangement "especially for somebody Britney's age and somebody capable of so much that I know firsthand she's capable of." The film notes that Spears has unsuccessfully moved for her father to be removed from his conservator role and shows clips of her fans in the #FreeBritney movement demanding the courts fulfill her wishes.

The documentary concludes with a list of individuals who declined to comment or be interviewed for the film, which include Spears's family. Spears was also asked to be interviewed, but it was "unclear if she received the requests."

== Reception ==
=== Ratings ===
The first-run airing on the FX channel had 265,000 same-day viewers, but it was available on Hulu the same day as the broadcast premiere. In the United Kingdom, its first broadcast averaged over 200,000 viewers on then-months-old channel Sky Documentaries, tripling the channel's previous viewership record. In Australia, the first broadcast on the Nine Network attracted 484,000 unique viewers and was the tenth most watched television program of the day. It was one of Hulu's most watched originals for 2021.

=== Critical response ===
On Rotten Tomatoes, the documentary holds an approval rating of 94% based on 33 reviews, with an average rating of 7.7/10. The website's critics consensus reads: "Framing Britney Spears asks more questions than it can answer, but remains a sobering examination of the toxic nature of celebrity culture." On Metacritic, the film has an aggregate score of 75 out of 100 based on 10 critics, indicating "generally favorable" reviews.

Daniel D'Addario of Variety stated "This film provides a sort of pocket portrait of a person for whom freedom has been denied, and for whom that denial comes as no surprise. Before [Spears's] father, the culture that idolized her had kept her a captive, too." Reviewing it for The Times, Ed Potton suggested it was "not an easy watch" due to the negative portrayal of Spears's father. Writing for The Guardian, Lucy Mangan noted the way the documentary emphasizes the consequences of sexism. For Fiona Sturges of The Independent, the documentary is "lacking in journalistic rigour." Writing for NME, Nick Levine described it as a "heartbreakingly human story that still lacks a happy ending." In a critical review for The Telegraph, Anita Singh opined that after decades of unwelcome attention from paparazzi, the documentary is "a help rather than a hindrance as she tries to reclaim control of her life." Variety named it one of the Best TV Shows of 2021, saying "The very best of the year’s scripted and unscripted projects seeking to reframe and reclaim recent pop-culture history, this doc had a seriousness of purpose and — not for nothing — could be argued to have made a greater impact than any other entrant on this list.".

=== Public response ===
On February 7, 2021, the phrase "We are sorry Britney" trended on Twitter. Several celebrities and television personalities received widespread backlash for their past remarks about Spears or interview questions directed at her, including Justin Timberlake, Diane Sawyer, Sarah Silverman, Joel McHale, Ivo Niehe, John O'Hurley, and Perez Hilton.

On February 12, 2021, Timberlake issued a public apology to Spears via Instagram, pledging to "take accountability" and that "I can do better and I will do better." This response was met with further backlash and criticism, as many found the apology "years too late."

After the documentary's release, numerous celebrities voiced support for Spears, including Howard Stern, Miley Cyrus, Dua Lipa, Kim Kardashian, Paris Hilton, Olivia Newton-John, Kacey Musgraves, Sarah Jessica Parker, Bette Midler, Kathy Najimy, Sara Sampaio, Josh Gad, Cardi B, Sam Smith, Charlie Puth, Ellie Goulding, Ava Max, Hayley Williams, Vanessa Carlton, Hayley Kiyoko, Bella Thorne, Courtney Love, Jon Bon Jovi, Amy Lee, Sandra Bernhard, Garbage, Emma Caulfield, Jameela Jamil, Pitbull, will.i.am, Heather Morris, Elizabeth Reaser, Lexi Alexander, Rebecca Mader, Rico Nasty, Andy Cohen, Valerie Bertinelli, and Liz Phair. Chika's support, however, was couched as a reflection on Timberlake's historical behavior, for which he had offered an apology.

=== Spears's reaction ===
On March 30, 2021, Spears wrote about her feelings about the documentary on Instagram. While she admitted she did not watch it in full, she said from the parts she did see "I was embarrassed by the light they put me in... I cried for two weeks and well .... I still cry sometimes!!!! [sic]". Spears further specified in an Instagram post later in July that she "didn't like the way the documentaries bring up humiliating moments from the past".

== International broadcast ==
Outside the United States, the documentary is distributed by Red Arrow Studios, parent company of co-producer Left/Right Productions.

== Follow-ups ==
On September 24, 2021, FX aired the follow-up documentary Controlling Britney Spears, being simultaneously added for streaming by Hulu. It was also created by The New York Times and made by the same creators of Framing Britney Spears, as part of The New York Times Presents series. Its initial broadcast on FX earned 197,000 same-day viewers. At the 74th Primetime Emmy Awards, it received a nomination for the Primetime Emmy Award for Outstanding Documentary or Nonfiction Special.

== Awards and nominations ==
Year	Association	Category	Work	Result	Ref.
2021	2021 MTV Movie & TV Awards	Best Music Documentary	Framing Britney Spears	Nominated	
2021	73rd Primetime Creative Arts Emmy Awards	Outstanding Documentary or Nonfiction Special	Framing Britney Spears	Nominated	
2021	73rd Primetime Creative Arts Emmy Awards	Outstanding Picture Editing for a Nonfiction Program	Geoff O'Brien, Pierre Takal	Nominated	
2021	37th TCA Awards	Outstanding Achievement in News and Information	Framing Britney Spears	Won	
