= Through the Storm: A Real Story of Fame and Family in a Tabloid World =

Memoir by Lynne Spears

- Cover
- Author: Lynne Spears
- Language: English
- Subject: Britney Spears; Jamie Lynn Spears; motherhood; adolescent sexuality
- Genre: Memoir
- Publisher: Thomas Nelson
- Publication date: September 16, 2008
- Publication place: United States
- Pages: 272
- ISBN: 978-1-59555-156-6
- Dewey Decimal: 782.42164/092
- LC Class: ML480.S714

Through the Storm: A Real Story of Fame and Family in a Tabloid World is a memoir by Lynne Spears that she co-wrote with Lorilee Craker. The memoir is about Lynne's daughters: Britney and Jamie Lynn. The book was announced in 2007 and published on September 16, 2008, by Thomas Nelson, a Christian publisher.

Prior to the book's release, the National Enquirer leaked several of the book's revelations, including that Britney had started drinking alcohol at age thirteen, soon after she began appearing on American variety show The All-New Mickey Mouse Club. When Britney was seventeen, her talent manager Larry Rudolph promoted her as a virgin who continued to shun premarital sex while dating teen idol Justin Timberlake.

Sam Lutfi, a former talent manager of Britney's, began a defamation lawsuit against Lynne for alleging in Through the Storm that he had isolated and drugged Britney. An Entertainment Tonight article by James Herman calls Through the Storm a "jaw-dropping tell-all book". In an Entertainment Weekly review, Adrienne Day writes that the book only provides information that can be found on Wikipedia, therefore it’s useless, and showed the gap between mother and daughter.

== Bibliography ==
- Tiegel, Eliot (2008). Overexposed: The Price of Fame. Phoenix Books. ISBN 978-1597775991.
- Wilson, Leah (2010). Ardeur: 14 Writers on the Anita Blake, Vampire Hunter Series. BenBella Books. ISBN 978-1933771472.
