= West Hollywood City Hall =

Historic building in West Hollywood, California

Coordinates: 34.0905°N 118.3707°W

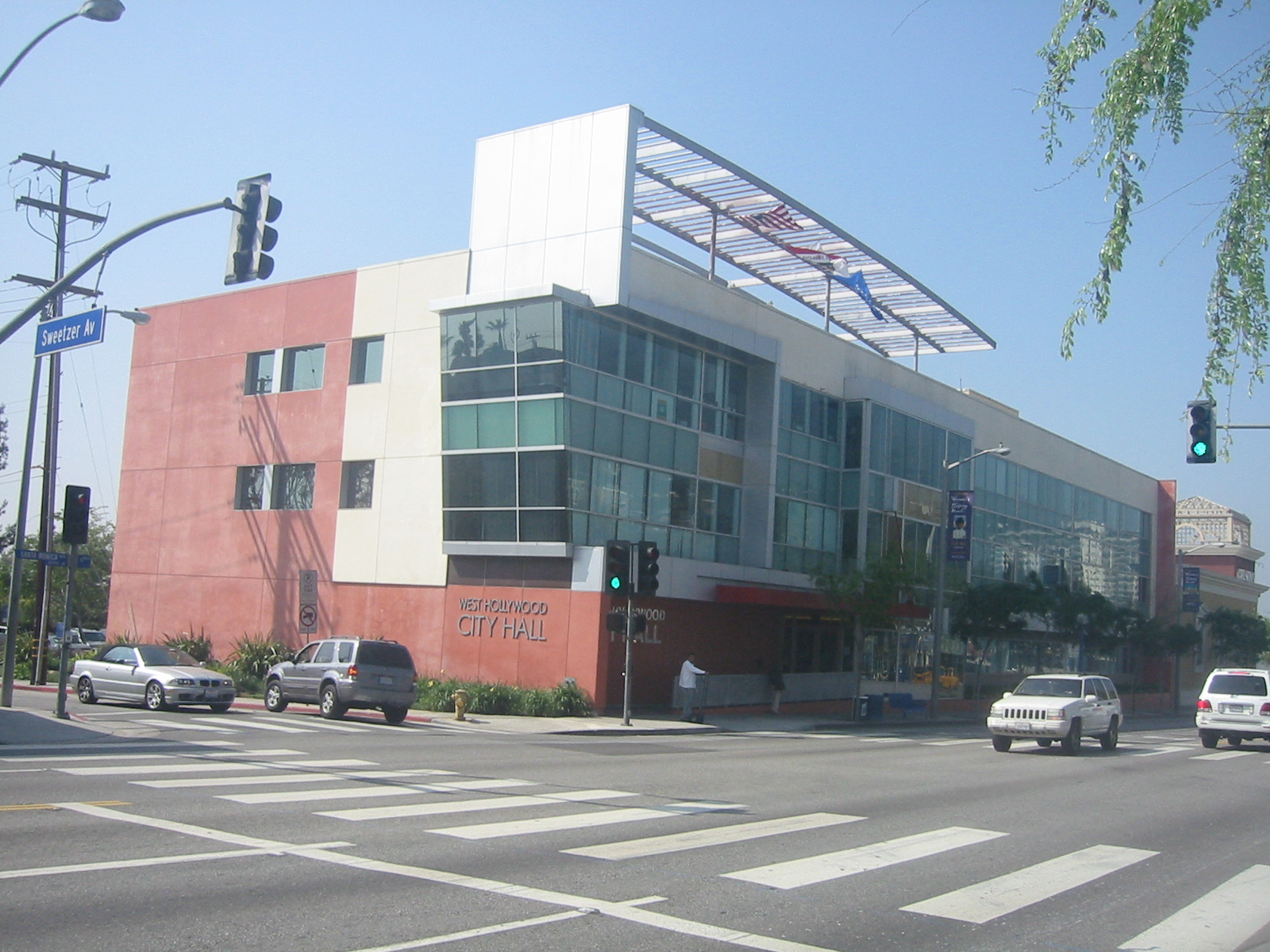
- The West Hollywood City Hall in 2007
- Location: 8300 Santa Monica Boulevard; West Hollywood, California, United States
- Established: 1962

The West Hollywood City Hall is a historic building in West Hollywood, California, U.S.

== Architectural significance ==
The building was completed in 1962. It was designed in the Modernist architectural style. It was renovated in 1995.

== Rainbow flag controversy ==
In an effort to be more inclusive towards the heterosexual community, the city council voted to take down the rainbow flag from the building in January 2014. A month later, they agreed to hoist a new flag with a rainbow logo.
