= Lynne Spears =

Mother of Britney Spears (born 1955)

- Born: Lynne Irene Bridges; May 4, 1955 (age 71); Magnolia, Mississippi, U.S.
- Education: Southeastern Louisiana University
- Occupations: Author; former daycare teacher; former teacher
- Spouse: Jamie Spears (m. 1976; div. 2002)
- Children: Bryan; Britney; Jamie Lynn

Lynne Irene Spears (née Bridges; born May 4, 1955) is an American author. She is also the mother of Bryan Spears, Britney Spears and Jamie Lynn Spears.

== Biography ==
=== Early life and family ===
Lynne Irene Bridges was born on May 4, 1955 in Magnolia, Mississippi to Lilian Irene Portell (1924–1993), a British woman of English and Maltese descent, and Barney O'Field Bridges (1919–1978), an American G.I. In 1945, her parents met and married in Portell's native London. Spears' maternal great-grandfather, Edward Portell, had immigrated to the United Kingdom from Malta while the country was a colony of the British Empire. Spears has an older brother, Barry "Sonny" Bridges (b. 1951). Their older sister Sandra Bridges Covington (1947–2007) died of ovarian cancer.

In July 1976, she married Jamie Spears. They divorced in May 2002. They have three children: son Bryan James (born 1977) and daughters Britney Jean (born 1981) and Jamie Lynn (born 1991).

In 1991, Lynne along with daughters Britney and Jamie Lynn moved to a sublet apartment in New York City, when Britney began attending Professional Performing Arts School. Her husband Jamie and son Bryan stayed in Kentwood. Britney soon began appearing on The Mickey Mouse Club (1993–1996), but it was canceled on its second season, and they returned to Kentwood.

== Career ==
Spears owned and operated a day care in Kentwood, Louisiana and later worked as a schoolteacher. Despite accompanying Britney on tours early in her career, she never worked as her daughter's manager and only briefly worked on Britney's fan club and website.

Spears has co-written two books about her daughter Britney. The first, Heart to Heart, was published in 2000 as a biographical book about Britney. A Mother's Gift was a novel released in 2001 and has been adapted into an ABC Family television film Brave New Girl. She was credited as a writer and executive producer in the film. A 2008 memoir, Through the Storm: A Real Story of Fame and Family in a Tabloid World, followed, detailing the public scrutiny that the Spears family faced after Britney's mental breakdown and Jamie Lynn's teen pregnancy. In 2020, she played the role of a stage mom in her daughter Jamie Lynn and Chantel Jeffries' music video for the song "Follow Me".

As of September 2023, she works as an independent consultant for Rodan + Fields and a substitute teacher in Louisiana.

== Personal life ==
Spears is a devout Christian, and openly discussed this in her memoir. She attended First Baptist Church in Kentwood, Louisiana with her family but she has been identified as a Catholic alongside her youngest daughter Jamie Lynn and two of her granddaughters, Jamie Lynn's daughters.

She has five grandchildren: grandsons Sean Preston Federline (born 2005) and Jayden James Federline (born 2006) from Britney; granddaughters Maddie Briann Aldridge (born 2008) and Ivey Joan Watson (born 2018) from Jamie Lynn; and Sophia Alexandra Spears (born 2011) from Bryan.

In November 2021, Spears requested $650,000 in legal fees from Britney's estate, suggesting that her lawyers had helped in the process of releasing Britney from the conservatorship imposed by the California court system in 2008. Lynne and her lawyers would later drop the case before appearing in court.

== Filmography ==
Film and television
Year	Title	Role	Notes
2001	Total Britney Live	Herself	Television special
2005	Britney & Kevin: Chaotic	Herself	Episode: "Veil of Secresy"
2013	I Am Britney Jean	Herself	Documentary film
2016	Jamie Lynn Spears: When the Lights Go Out	Herself	Documentary film

Music videos
Year	Title	Artist	Role
2020	"Follow Me"	Jamie Lynn Spears and Chantel Jeffries	Stage mom

=== As producer and writer ===
Year	Title	Role	Notes
2004	Brave New Girl	Producer and writer	ABC Family television film

== Bibliography ==
Spears has co-written two books and written one memoir so far.

- Spears, Lynne; Spears, Britney (May 9, 2000): Heart to Heart. Three Rivers Press. ISBN 978-0-609-80701-9
- Spears, Lynne; Spears, Britney (April 10, 2001): A Mother's Gift. Delacorte Books. ISBN 978-0-385-72953-6
- Spears, Lynne (September 16, 2008): Through the Storm: A Real Story of Fame and Family in a Tabloid World. Thomas Nelson. ISBN 978-1-59555-156-6
