= Brenda J. Penny =

American judge

Judge on the Los Angeles County Superior Court
- Incumbent
- Assumed office 2018

Personal details
- Born: United States
- Children: Prentice Penny
- Education: University of Southern California; University of West Los Angeles
- Occupation: Judge

Brenda J. Penny is an American judge on the Los Angeles County Superior Court. She was appointed in 2018 by then California Governor Jerry Brown and is best known for her role in overseeing Britney Spears's conservatorship dispute.

== Education and early career ==
Penny obtained a B.A. from the University of Southern California and a J.D. from the University of West Los Angeles School of Law.

After graduating from law school, she started working at Pasadena law firm Gronemeier and Barker in 1982 as an associate and was named partner in 1989. In 1994, she left the firm to be a sole practitioner until 1997.

== Los Angeles County Superior Court ==
In 1997, she was hired as a probate attorney at the Superior Court of Los Angeles County, and in 2001 was promoted to Assistant Supervising Probate Attorney. A registered Democrat, Penny was elected by the superior court judges to serve as court commissioner in 2014.

In 2018, former California Governor Jerry Brown appointed her to serve as a Superior Court of Los Angeles County judge. In March 2020, she won re-election by default after the primary and general elections were canceled because she was the only candidate. Her term is slated to end on January 4, 2027.

=== Britney Spears conservatorship ===
On July 14, 2021, Judge Penny ruled that Spears could hire her own lawyer, approving Mathew Rosengart, a former federal prosecutor who is repeatedly featured on The Hollywood Reporter's "power lawyer" list, to represent her.

On November 12, 2021, Judge Penny terminated the conservatorship.
