= List of Britney Spears live performances =

Britney Spears live performances
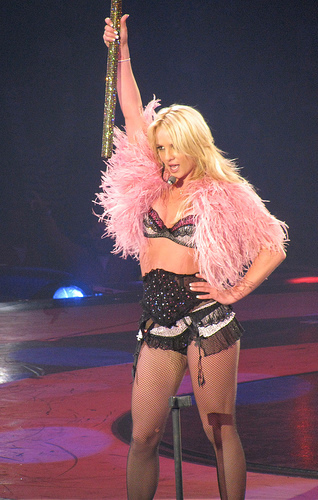
- Spears performing during her the Circus Starring Britney Spears tour (2009). After completion, it grossed $131.8 million, becoming her most successful tour to date.
- Concert tours: 10
- Concert residencies: 1
- Promotional tours: 1
- Supporting tours: 1
- Award shows: 28
- Television shows: 99
- Television specials: 22
- Music festivals: 22
- Benefit events: 1
- Sporting events: 6
- Other performances: 11
- Guest appearances: 1

American entertainer Britney Spears has embarked on ten headlining concert tours and one concert residency. According to Pollstar, Spears has grossed $485 million in revenue throughout her career. During 1998–1999, she embarked on a promotional tour in malls and food courts across North America, titled L'Oreal Hair Zone Mall Tour, and served as an opening act for NSYNC's in Concert tour in the United States before starting her 1999 headlining debut, the ...Baby One More Time Tour, which was also based in North America. Its success prompted an extension of dates in the US, entitled (You Drive Me) Crazy Tour, the following year. The tour was positively received by critics but generated some controversy due to her racy outfits. Jae-Ha Kim of the Chicago Sun-Times commented that "Spears has that 'it' factor that worked for pinup queens of the past."

From 2000 to 2001, she performed the Oops!... I Did It Again Tour in North America, Europe, and Brazil. It was critically appreciated for Spears's energy and performance, as well as the band, and went on to gross $40.9 million. She then followed this with the Dream Within a Dream Tour in North America and Japan, during 2001–2002. The performances were accompanied by many special effects, including a water screen that pumped two tons of water onto the stage during the encore performance of "...Baby One More Time". The tour grossed $53.3 million from 946,169 tickets sold.

With the Onyx Hotel Tour, in 2004, Spears felt inspired to create a show set in different areas of a hotel and mixed it with the concept of an onyx stone. The tour was canceled after Spears hurt her knee while shooting a music video. Overall, the Onyx Hotel Tour grossed $34 million while visiting North America and Europe. After a three-year hiatus from performing, her next tour would be the M+M's Tour in 2007. It consisted of six short, 15-minute shows in House of Blues clubs around the United States.

In 2008, after highly publicized personal struggles, Spears was involuntarily placed in a conservatorship by her father and embarked on the Circus Starring Britney Spears tour the following year. All the North American concerts were sold out, and it broke attendance records in many cities. The show was also performed in Europe and Oceania. It went on to become the highest-grossing tour of her career and the fifth highest-grossing tour of 2009, earning $131.8 million with an attendance of 1.4 million. In 2011, Spears embarked on her Femme Fatale Tour, which visited North America, Europe, Asia, and South America, and ended up grossing $68.7 million.

On December 27, 2013, Spears began her first concert residency, Britney: Piece of Me, at Planet Hollywood Resort & Casino in Las Vegas. Originally scheduled to run for two years, the show's success led to a two-year extension, and the final performance was set on December 31, 2017. It grossed $137.7 million from 916,184 tickets sold. During the summer of 2017, Spears brought the show to Asia as an international tour, marketed as Britney: Live in Concert. It was her first concert tour in six years. In 2018, she continued the show in the United States and Europe as the Piece of Me Tour, which grossed $54.3 million.

In January 2019, Spears announced an indefinite hiatus and the cancellation of her planned concert residency, Britney: Domination, and later entered in a legal battle with her father over her conservatorship, which was terminated in November 2021. In September 2022, Spears stated that she would "probably never perform again" due to the trauma that the arrangement caused to her life.

== Concert tours ==
=== Headlining ===
Title	Date	Associated album(s)	Continent(s)	Shows	Gross	Gross adj. in 2025	Attendance	Ref.
...Baby One More Time Tour	June 28 – September 15, 1999	...Baby One More Time	North America	57	—N/a	—N/a	—N/a	
(You Drive Me) Crazy Tour	March 8 – April 24, 2000	...Baby One More Time; Oops!... I Did It Again	North America	25	—N/a	—N/a	—N/a	
Oops!... I Did It Again Tour	June 20, 2000 – January 18, 2001	Oops!... I Did It Again	North America; Europe; South America	89	$40,900,000	$76,465,217	1,500,000 (Note: Estimated attendees)	
Dream Within a Dream Tour	November 1, 2001 – July 28, 2002	Britney	North America; Asia	69	$53,300,000	$95,407,493	946,169	
The Onyx Hotel Tour	March 2 – June 6, 2004	In the Zone	North America; Europe	54	$34,054,960	$58,048,227	601,040	
The M+M's Tour	May 1 – 20, 2007	—N/a	North America	6	$290,226	$450,640	6,893	
The Circus Starring Britney Spears	March 3 – November 29, 2009	Circus	North America; Europe; Oceania	97	$131,800,000	$197,791,996	1,406,466	
Femme Fatale Tour	June 16 – December 10, 2011	Femme Fatale	North America; Europe; Asia; South America	79	$68,700,000	$98,324,334	697,957	
Britney: Live in Concert	June 3 – July 3, 2017	—N/a	Asia	11	—N/a	—N/a	125,800	
Piece of Me Tour	July 12 – October 21, 2018	—N/a	North America; Europe	31	$54,300,000	$69,619,997	260,531	

=== Promotional ===
Title	Date	Associated album	Continent	Shows	Ref.
L'Oreal Hair Zone Mall Tour	June 1998 – January 29, 1999	...Baby One More Time	North America	Unknown	

=== Supporting ===
Title	Headliner	Date	Associated album	Continent	Shows	Ref.
NSYNC in Concert	NSYNC	November 17, 1998 – January 17, 1999	...Baby One More Time	North America	40	

== Concert residencies ==
Title	Date	Venue	City	Shows	Gross	Gross adj. in 2025	Attendance	Ref.
Britney: Piece of Me	December 27, 2013 – December 31, 2017	The AXIS	Paradise, Nevada	248	$137,695,392	$180,858,392	916,184	

== Award shows ==
List of performances at award shows, with the location and performed songs
Date	Event	Venue	Location	Performed song(s)	Ref.
May 1, 1999	Kids' Choice Awards of 1999	Pauley Pavilion	Los Angeles, California	"...Baby One More Time"	
May 5, 1999	World Music Awards of 1999	Salle des Étoiles	Larvotto, Monaco	"The Beat Goes On"; "...Baby One More Time"	
August 1, 1999	Teen Choice Awards of 1999	Barker Hangar	Santa Monica, California	"Sometimes"; "(You Drive Me) Crazy"	
September 9, 1999	MTV Video Music Awards of 1999	Metropolitan Opera House	New York City, New York	"...Baby One More Time"	
September 23, 1999	MuchMusic Video Awards of 1999	299 Queen Street West	Ontario, Canada	"Sometimes"; "(You Drive Me) Crazy"	
November 11, 1999	MTV Europe Music Awards of 1999	Point Depot	Dublin, Ireland	"...Baby One More Time"/"(You Drive Me) Crazy"	
December 1, 1999	The Record of the Year of 1999	The London Studios	London, England	"...Baby One More Time"	
December 5, 1999	Smash Hits Poll Winners Party of 1999	London Arena	London, England	"...Baby One More Time"	
December 8, 1999	Billboard Music Awards of 1999	MGM Grand Garden Arena	Paradise, Nevada	"...Baby One More Time"/"(You Drive Me) Crazy"	
February 23, 2000	Grammy Awards of 2000	Staples Center	Los Angeles, California	"From the Bottom of My Broken Heart"; "...Baby One More Time"	
September 7, 2000	MTV Video Music Awards of 2000	Radio City Music Hall	New York City, New York	"(I Can't Get No) Satisfaction"; "Oops!... I Did It Again"	
November 4, 2000	Radio Music Awards of 2000	Preussag Arena	Hanover, Germany	"Stronger"	
November 17, 2000	M6 Awards of 2000	Zénith Arena	Lille, France	"Stronger"	
January 8, 2001	American Music Awards of 2001	Shrine Auditorium	Los Angeles, California	"Stronger"	
September 6, 2001	MTV Video Music Awards of 2001	Metropolitan Opera House	New York City, New York	"I'm a Slave 4 U"	
December 4, 2001	Billboard Music Awards of 2001	Bellagio Hotel	Paradise, Nevada	"I'm a Slave 4 U"	
January 9, 2002	American Music Awards of 2002	Shrine Auditorium	Los Angeles, California	"I'm Not a Girl, Not Yet a Woman"	
January 19, 2002	NRJ Music Awards of 2002	Palais des Festivals et des Congrès	Cannes, France	"I'm a Slave 4 U"	
August 28, 2003	MTV Video Music Awards of 2003	Radio City Music Hall	New York City, New York	"Like a Virgin"/"Hollywood"/"Work It" (with Christina Aguilera, Madonna, and Missy Elliott)	
November 16, 2003	American Music Awards of 2003	Shrine Auditorium	Los Angeles, California	"Me Against the Music"	
January 24, 2004	NRJ Music Awards of 2004	Palais des Festivals et des Congrès	Cannes, France	"Toxic"	
September 9, 2007	MTV Video Music Awards of 2007	The Palms	Paradise, Nevada	"Trouble" intro; "Gimme More"	
November 27, 2008	Bambi Awards of 2008	Oberrheinhalle	Offenburg, Germany	"Womanizer"	
December 16, 2008	NTV's Best Artist of 2008	Makuhari Messe	Chiba, Japan	"Womanizer"	
May 22, 2011	Billboard Music Awards of 2011	MGM Grand Garden Arena	Paradise, Nevada	"S&M" (with Rihanna); "Super Bass"/"Till the World Ends" (with Nicki Minaj)	
May 17, 2015	Billboard Music Awards of 2015	The AXIS	Paradise, Nevada	"Pretty Girls" (with Iggy Azalea)	
May 22, 2016	Billboard Music Awards of 2016	T-Mobile Arena	Paradise, Nevada	"Work Bitch"; "Womanizer"; "I Love Rock 'n' Roll"; "Breathe on Me"; "I'm a Slave 4 U"; "Touch of My Hand"; "Toxic"	
August 28, 2016	MTV Video Music Awards of 2016	Madison Square Garden	New York City, New York	"Make Me"/"Me, Myself & I" (with G-Eazy)	

== Television shows ==
List of performances at television shows, with the country of origin and performed songs
Date	Event	Country	Performed song(s)	Ref.
November 21, 1998	Wami on Miami	United States	"...Baby One More Time"	
January 7, 1999	Motown Live	United States	"...Baby One More Time"; "Sometimes"	
January 8, 1999	The Howie Mandel Show	United States	"...Baby One More Time"	
January 29, 1999	The Ricki Lake Show	United States	"...Baby One More Time"	
January 29, 1999	Electric Circus	Canada	"...Baby One More Time"	
February 2, 1999	Roxy Bar	Italy	"...Baby One More Time"; "Sometimes"	
February 3, 1999	The Dini Petty Show	Canada	"...Baby One More Time"	
February 4, 1999	SMTV Live	United Kingdom	"...Baby One More Time"	
February 4, 1999	CITV	United Kingdom	"...Baby One More Time"	
February 6, 1999	The National Lottery Draws	United Kingdom	"...Baby One More Time"	
February 8, 1999	The Rosie O'Donnell Show	United States	"...Baby One More Time"	
March 10, 1999	Donny & Marie	United States	"...Baby One More Time"	
April 13, 1999	The Famous Jett Jackson	Canada/United States	"...Baby One More Time"; "Sometimes"	
April 24, 1999	Pop Jam	Japan	"...Baby One More Time"	
April 26, 1999	Hey! Hey! Hey! Music Champ	Japan	"...Baby One More Time"	
April 27, 1999	The Tonight Show with Jay Leno	United States	"...Baby One More Time"	
May 3, 1999	Live with Regis and Kathie Lee	United States	"...Baby One More Time"	
May 14, 1999	This Morning	United Kingdom	"Sometimes"	
May 24, 1999	The Rosie O'Donnell Show	United States	"Sometimes"	
May 25, 1999	Late Show with David Letterman	United States	"...Baby One More Time"	
May 27, 1999	Top of the Pops Germany	Germany	"...Baby One More Time"; "Sometimes"	
June 9, 1999	The View	United States	"...Baby One More Time"; "Sometimes"	
June 12, 1999	Música Sí	Spain	"(You Drive Me) Crazy"; "From the Bottom of My Broken Heart"; "Born to Make You Happy"; "Sometimes"; "...Baby One More Time"	
July 28, 1999	MTV All Access	United States	"(You Drive Me) Crazy"; "...Baby One More Time"	
September 24, 1999	The Tonight Show with Jay Leno	United States	"(You Drive Me) Crazy"	
September 27, 1999	The Rosie O'Donnell Show	United States	"(You Drive Me) Crazy"	
October 8, 1999	Les Années tubes	France	"Sometimes"; "(You Drive Me) Crazy"	
October 8, 1999	Nulle part ailleurs	France	"(You Drive Me) Crazy"	
October 9, 1999	Carramba! Che Fortuna	Italy	"...Baby One More Time"; "(You Drive Me) Crazy"	
October 11, 1999	TROS TV Show	Netherlands	"(You Drive Me) Crazy"	
October 13, 1999	Hit Machine	France	"Sometimes"; "(You Drive Me) Crazy"	
October 16, 1999	Live & Kicking	United Kingdom	"(You Drive Me) Crazy"	
November 13, 1999	Wetten, dass..?	Germany	"...Baby One More Time"/"(You Drive Me) Crazy"	
January 7, 2000	Good Morning America	United States	"From the Bottom of My Broken Heart"; "...Baby One More Time"	
January 8, 2000	The National Lottery Draws	United Kingdom	"Born to Make You Happy"	
January 8, 2000	Blue Peter	United Kingdom	"Born to Make You Happy"	
January 28, 2000	Top of the Pops	United Kingdom	"Born to Make You Happy"	
April 17, 2000	Top of the Pops Germany	Germany	"Oops!... I Did It Again"	
April 18, 2000	VIVA Interaktiv	Germany	"Oops!... I Did It Again"	
April 20, 2000	This Morning	United Kingdom	"Oops!... I Did It Again"	
April 20, 2000	Top of the Pops	United Kingdom	"Oops!... I Did It Again"	
April 27, 2000	The National Lottery Draws	United Kingdom	"Oops!... I Did It Again"	
April 27, 2000	Pepsi Chart	United Kingdom	"Oops!... I Did It Again"; "Born to Make You Happy"	
April 29, 2000	All That	United States	"Oops!... I Did It Again"	
May 1, 2000	Pop Jam	Japan	"Oops!... I Did It Again"	
May 9, 2000	MTV's First Listen	United States	"Oops!... I Did It Again"	
May 12, 2000	The Rosie O'Donnell Show	United States	"Oops!... I Did It Again"; "Don't Let Me Be the Last to Know"; "(You Drive Me) Crazy"	
May 13, 2000	Saturday Night Live	United States	"Oops!... I Did It Again"; "Don't Let Me Be the Last to Know"	
May 17, 2000	The View	United States	"Oops!... I Did It Again"; "Don't Let Me Be the Last to Know"	
June 30, 2000	Today	United States	"...Baby One More Time"; "Lucky"; "Oops!... I Did It Again"	
July 19, 2000	MTV All Access	United States	"Lucky"; "Oops!... I Did It Again"	
August 19, 2000	Top of the Pops Germany	Germany	"Lucky"	
August 25, 2000	Top of the Pops	United Kingdom	"Lucky"	
September 10, 2001	The Rosie O'Donnell Show	United States	"I'm a Slave 4 U"	
September 13, 2001	Channel V Australia	Australia	"Stronger"; "I'm a Slave 4 U"; "I'm Not a Girl, Not Yet a Woman"	
November 5, 2001	The Rosie O'Donnell Show	United States	"I'm Not a Girl, Not Yet a Woman"	
November 6, 2001	Late Show with David Letterman	United States	"I'm a Slave 4 U"	
November 13, 2001	SMTV Live	United Kingdom	"Overprotected"; "I'm a Slave 4 U"	
November 13, 2001	CD:UK	United Kingdom	"I'm Not a Girl, Not Yet a Woman"	
January 2, 2002	Graines de star	France	"Overprotected"; "I'm Not a Girl, Not Yet a Woman"	
January 15, 2002	VIVA Interaktiv	Germany	"I'm a Slave 4 U"; "Overprotected"	
January 18, 2002	Top of the Pops	United Kingdom	"Overprotected"; "I'm Not a Girl, Not Yet a Woman"	
January 19, 2002	CD:UK	United Kingdom	"Overprotected"; "Stronger"	
February 1, 2002	Top of the Pops	United Kingdom	"Overprotected"	
February 2, 2002	Saturday Night Live	United States	"I'm Not a Girl, Not Yet a Woman"; "Boys"	
February 4, 2002	The Oprah Winfrey Show	United States	"I'm Not a Girl, Not Yet a Woman"; "I'm a Slave 4 U"	
February 11, 2002	The Tonight Show with Jay Leno	United States	"I'm Not a Girl, Not Yet a Woman"	
February 23, 2002	All That	United States	"I'm Not a Girl, Not Yet a Woman"	
March 10, 2002	Domenica in	Italy	"I'm Not a Girl, Not Yet a Woman"	
March 23, 2002	Wetten, dass..?	Germany	"I'm Not a Girl, Not Yet a Woman"	
March 30, 2002	The Saturday Show	United Kingdom	"Overprotected"; "I'm Not a Girl, Not Yet a Woman"	
April 18, 2002	The Pepsi Chart	Australia	"I'm a Slave 4 U"; "Boys"; "I'm Not a Girl, Not Yet a Woman"	
April 2002	Mezamashi TV	Japan	"I'm Not a Girl, Not Yet a Woman"	
October 18, 2003	Saturday Night Live	United States	"Me Against the Music"; "Everytime"	
October 25, 2003	CD:UK	United Kingdom	"Me Against the Music"; "Boys"/"I'm a Slave 4 U"; "Breathe on Me"	
October 28, 2003	Diggin' It	United Kingdom	"Me Against the Music"	
October 2003	GMTV Today	United Kingdom	"Me Against the Music"	
November 1, 2003	V Graham Norton	United Kingdom	"Me Against the Music"	
November 17, 2003	The Tonight Show with Jay Leno	United States	"Me Against the Music"	
November 18, 2003	Total Request Live	United States	"Me Against the Music"; "(I Got That) Boom Boom" (with the Ying Yang Twins)	
November 24, 2003	Live! with Regis and Kelly	United States	"Me Against the Music"	
January 21, 2004	Top of the Pops Germany	Germany	"Me Against the Music"; "(I Got That) Boom Boom"; "Toxic"; "Everytime"	
January 22, 2004	GMTV Today	United Kingdom	"Toxic"	
January 22, 2004	Popworld	United Kingdom	"Toxic"	
January 23, 2004	Blue Peter	United Kingdom	"Toxic"	
January 24, 2004	Top of the Pops	United Kingdom	"Toxic"	
February 11, 2004	On Air with Ryan Seacrest	United States	"Toxic"	
February 11, 2004	The Ellen DeGeneres Show	United States	"Toxic"	
May 21, 2004	Top of the Pops Italy	Italy	"Toxic"	
June 25, 2004	Top of the Pops	United Kingdom	"Everytime"	
November 28, 2008	Star Academy	France	"Womanizer"	
November 29, 2008	The X Factor	United Kingdom	"Womanizer"	
December 2, 2008	Good Morning America	United States	"Circus"; "Womanizer"	
December 14, 2008	Hey! Hey! Hey! Music Champ	Japan	"Womanizer"	
March 29, 2011	Good Morning America	United States	"Hold It Against Me"; "Big Fat Bass"; "Till the World Ends"	
March 29, 2011	Jimmy Kimmel Live!	United States	"Hold It Against Me"; "Big Fat Bass"; "Till the World Ends"	
August 25, 2016	The Late Late Show with James Corden (Carpool Karaoke)	United States	"Oops!... I Did It Again"; "Womanizer"; "Make Me"; "Toxic"; "...Baby One More Time"	
September 1, 2016	Today	United States	"Make Me"; "Do You Wanna Come Over?"	
October 1, 2016	The Jonathan Ross Show	United Kingdom	"Make Me"	

== Television specials ==
List of performances at television specials, with the country of origin and performed songs
Date	Event	Country	Performed song(s)	Ref.
March 16, 1999	Walt Disney Easter Parade	United States	"...Baby One More Time"	
May 12, 1999	Walt Disney Summer Jam Concert	United States	"Sometimes"; "...Baby One More Time"	
August 9, 1999	Summer Music Mania	United States	"(You Drive Me) Crazy"; "Soda Pop"; "Sometimes"; "...Baby One More Time"	
August 21, 1999	Disney Channel in Concert	United States	"(You Drive Me) Crazy"; "Born to Make You Happy"; "From the Bottom of My Broken Heart"; "I Will Be There"; "Sometimes"; "...Baby One More Time"	
November 22, 1999	Big Help Holiday Jam Concert	United States	"...Baby One More Time"/"(You Drive Me) Crazy"	
November 30, 1999	Christmas in Rockefeller Plaza	United States	"Silent Night"; "From the Bottom of My Broken Heart"	
May 14, 2000	Britney Live	United States	"(You Drive Me) Crazy"; "Oops!... I Did It Again"; "Don't Let Me Be the Last to Know"	
June 5, 2000	Britney in Hawaii	United States	"(You Drive Me) Crazy"; "Sometimes"; "From the Bottom of My Broken Heart"; "Born to Make You Happy"; "Oops!... I Did It Again"; "Don't Let Me Be the Last to Know"; "The Beat Goes On"; "I Will Be There"; "...Baby One More Time"	
August 13, 2000	Summer Music Mania 2000	United States	"...Baby One More Time"; "Don't Let Me Be the Last to Know"	
September 22, 2000	Britney Spears in Concert	United Kingdom	"(You Drive Me) Crazy"; "Stronger"; "What U See (Is What U Get)"; "From the Bottom of My Broken Heart"; "Born to Make You Happy"; "Lucky"; "Sometimes"; "Don't Let Me Be the Last to Know"; "The Beat Goes On"; "Don't Go Knockin' on My Door"; "(I Can't Get No) Satisfaction"; "...Baby One More Time"; "Oops!... I Did It Again"	
November 30, 2000	Britney Spears: There's No Place Like Home	United States	"(You Drive Me) Crazy"; "Stronger"; "What U See (Is What U Get)"; "From the Bottom of My Broken Heart"; "Born to Make You Happy"; "Lucky"; "Don't Let Me Be the Last to Know"; "The Beat Goes On"; "Don't Go Knockin' on My Door"; "(I Can't Get No) Satisfaction"; "...Baby One More Time"; "Oops!... I Did It Again"	
September 7, 2001	Michael Jackson: 30th Anniversary Celebration	United States	"The Way You Make Me Feel" (with Michael Jackson)	
November 3, 2001	Britney: Playback	United States	"I'm Not a Girl, Not Yet a Woman"	
November 11, 2001	Total Britney Live	United States	"I'm a Slave 4 U"; "I'm Not a Girl, Not Yet a Woman"; "Stronger"	
November 18, 2001	Britney Spears Live from Las Vegas	United States	"Oops!... I Did It Again"; "(You Drive Me) Crazy"; "Overprotected"; "Born to Make You Happy"; "Lucky"; "Sometimes"; "Boys"; "Stronger"; "I'm Not a Girl, Not Yet a Woman"; "I Love Rock 'n' Roll"; "What It's Like to Be Me"; "Lonely"; "Don't Let Me Be the Last to Know"; "Anticipating"; "I'm a Slave 4 U"; "...Baby One More Time"	
November 17, 2003	Britney Spears: In the Zone	United States	"Toxic"; "Breathe on Me"; "Boys"/"I'm a Slave 4 U"; "(I Got That) Boom Boom" (with the Ying Yang Twins); "Everytime"; "...Baby One More Time"; "Me Against the Music"	
December 26, 2003	BoA & Britney	South Korea	"(I Got That) Boom Boom"; "Me Against the Music"; "Boys"/"I'm a Slave 4 U"; "Toxic"	
March 28, 2004	Britney Spears Live from Miami	United States	"Toxic"; "Overprotected"; "Boys"; "Showdown"; "...Baby One More Time"; "Oops!... I Did It Again"; "(You Drive Me) Crazy"; "Everytime"; "The Hook Up"; "I'm a Slave 4 U"; "Shadow"; "Touch of My Hand"; "Breathe on Me"; "Outrageous"; "(I Got That) Boom Boom"; "Me Against the Music"	
April 3, 2011	Britney Spears: I Am the Femme Fatale	United States	"Hold It Against Me"; "Big Fat Bass"; "Till the World Ends"	
November 12, 2011	Britney Spears Live: The Femme Fatale Tour	United States	"Hold It Against Me"; "Up n' Down"; "3"; "Piece of Me"; "Big Fat Bass"; "How I Roll"; "Lace and Leather"; "If U Seek Amy"; "Gimme More"; "(Drop Dead) Beautiful" (with Sabi); "Don't Let Me Be the Last to Know"; "Boys"; "...Baby One More Time"/"S&M"; "Trouble for Me"; "I'm a Slave 4 U"; "I Wanna Go"; "Womanizer"; "Toxic"; "Till the World Ends" (with Nicki Minaj)	
December 31, 2017	Dick Clark's New Year's Rockin' Eve	United States	"Work Bitch"; "Toxic"	
January 1, 2018	Dick Clark's New Year's Rockin' Eve	United States	"Work Bitch"; "Toxic"	

== Music festivals ==
List of performances at music festivals, with the location and performed songs
Date	Event	Venue	Location	Performed song(s)	Ref.
May 16, 1998	Singapore Jazz Festival 1998	Singapore Convention Centre	Singapore	"...Baby One More Time"; "Sometimes"; "You Got It All"	
November 21, 1998	Y100's Wing Ding Festival 1998	Young Circle Park	Hollywood, Florida	"...Baby One More Time"; "Sometimes"	
May 31, 1999	Festivalbar 1999	Prato della Valle	Padua, Italy	"...Baby One More Time"	
June 3, 1999	Walmart Live Concert Series	Bud Walton Arena	Washington, D.C.	"(You Drive Me) Crazy"; "Sometimes"; "Thinkin' About You"; "Born to Make You Happy"; "I Will Be There"; "...Baby One More Time"	
June 4, 1999	Z100's Zootopia 1999	Continental Airlines Arena	East Rutherford, New Jersey	"(You Drive Me) Crazy"; "Sometimes"; "Born to Make You Happy"; "I Will Be There"; "...Baby One More Time"	
June 5, 1999	Kiss 108 Concert 1999	Xfinity Center	Mansfield, Massachusetts	"(You Drive Me) Crazy"; "Sometimes"; "Born to Make You Happy"; "I Will Be There"; "...Baby One More Time"	
June 12, 1999	Wango Tango 1999	Dodger Stadium	Los Angeles, California	"(You Drive Me) Crazy"; "Sometimes"; "Born to Make You Happy"; "...Baby One More Time"	
July 4, 1999	A Day in the Garden Festival 1999	Max Yasgur's Farm	New York City, New York	"(You Drive Me) Crazy"; "Sometimes"; "Born to Make You Happy"; "I Will Be There"; "...Baby One More Time"	
October 27, 1999	B96's Halloween Bash 1999	Allstate Arena	Rosemont, Illinois	"(You Drive Me) Crazy"; "Sometimes"; "Born to Make You Happy"; "...Baby One More Time"	
December 11, 1999	WKTU's Miracle on 34th Street	Hammerstein Ballroom	New York City, New York	"...Baby One More Time"	
January 18, 2001	Rock in Rio III	City of Rock	Rio de Janeiro, Brazil	"(You Drive Me) Crazy"; "Stronger"; "What U See (Is What U Get)"; "From the Bottom of My Broken Heart"; "Born to Make You Happy"; "Lucky"; "Sometimes"; "Don't Let Me Be the Last to Know"; "The Beat Goes On"; "Don't Go Knockin' on My Door"; "(I Can't Get No) Satisfaction"; "...Baby One More Time"; "Oops!... I Did It Again"	
March 9, 2002	Sanremo Music Festival 2002	Ariston Theatre	Sanremo, Italy	"I'm Not a Girl, Not Yet a Woman"	
December 5, 2003	KIIS-FM's Jingle Ball 2003	Staples Center	Los Angeles, California	"Toxic"; "Breathe on Me"; "Me Against the Music"	
June 5, 2004	Rock in Rio Lisboa	Bela Vista Park	Lisbon, Portugal	"Toxic"; "Overprotected"; "Boys"; "Showdown"; "...Baby One More Time"; "(You Drive Me) Crazy"; "Everytime"; "The Hook Up"; "I'm a Slave 4 U"; "Shadow"; "Breathe on Me"; "Outrageous"; "(I Got That) Boom Boom"; "Me Against the Music"	
July 9, 2011	Summerfest 2011	Marcus Amphitheater	Milwaukee, Wisconsin	"Hold It Against Me"; "Up n' Down"; "3"; "Piece of Me"; "Big Fat Bass"; "How I Roll"; "Lace and Leather"; "If U Seek Amy"; "Gimme More"; "(Drop Dead) Beautiful"; "Don't Let Me Be the Last to Know"; "Boys"; "...Baby One More Time"/"S&M"; "Trouble for Me"; "I'm a Slave 4 U"; "Burning Up"; "I Wanna Go"; "Till the World Ends"	
September 24, 2016	iHeartRadio Music Festival 2016	T-Mobile Arena	Paradise, Nevada	"Work Bitch"; "Womanizer"; "I'm a Slave 4 U"; "Do You Wanna Come Over?"; "Toxic"; "Stronger"; "(You Drive Me) Crazy"; "Make Me"/"Me, Myself & I" (with G-Eazy)	
September 27, 2016	Apple Music Festival 2016	Roundhouse	London, England	"Work Bitch"; "Womanizer"; "Break the Ice"; "Piece of Me"; "...Baby One More Time"; "Oops!... I Did It Again"; "Me Against the Music"; "Gimme More"; "Boys"; "Do You Wanna Come Over?"; "I'm a Slave 4 U"; "Make Me"; "Freakshow"; "Do Somethin'"; "Circus"; "If U Seek Amy"; "Breathe on Me"; "Touch of My Hand"; "Toxic"; "Stronger"; "(You Drive Me) Crazy"; "Till the World Ends"	
December 2, 2016	KIIS-FM's Jingle Ball 2016	Staples Center	Los Angeles, California	"Work Bitch"; "Womanizer"; "I'm a Slave 4 U"; "Do You Wanna Come Over?"; "Make Me"; "Toxic"; "Stronger"; "(You Drive Me) Crazy"; "Slumber Party" (with Tinashe)	
December 3, 2016	99.7 NOW's Triple Ho Show 2016	SAP Center	San Jose, California	"Work Bitch"; "Womanizer"; "I'm a Slave 4 U"; "Do You Wanna Come Over?"; "Make Me"; "Toxic"; "Stronger"; "(You Drive Me) Crazy"; "Slumber Party" (with Tinashe)	
December 10, 2016	B96's Pepsi Jingle Bash 2016	Allstate Arena	Rosemont, Illinois	"Work Bitch"; "Womanizer"; "I'm a Slave 4 U"; "Do You Wanna Come Over?"; "Make Me" (with G-Eazy); "Toxic"; "Stronger"; "(You Drive Me) Crazy"; "Slumber Party" (with Tinashe)	
August 4, 2018	Brighton Pride 2018	Preston Park	Brighton, England	"Work Bitch"; "Womanizer"; "Break the Ice"; "Piece of Me"; "...Baby One More Time"; "Oops!... I Did It Again"; "Me Against the Music"; "Gimme More"; "Clumsy"; "Change Your Mind (No Seas Cortes)"; "Boys"; "Do You Wanna Come Over?"; "I'm a Slave 4 U"; "Make Me"; "Freakshow"; "Do Somethin'"; "Circus"; "If U Seek Amy"; "Breathe on Me"; "Slumber Party"; "Touch of My Hand"; "Toxic"; "Stronger"; "(You Drive Me) Crazy"; "Till the World Ends"	
August 8, 2018	Smukfest 2018	Skanderborg Dyrehave	Skanderborg, Denmark	"Work Bitch"; "Womanizer"; "Break the Ice"; "Piece of Me"; "...Baby One More Time"; "Oops!... I Did It Again"; "Me Against the Music"; "Gimme More"; "Clumsy"; "Change Your Mind (No Seas Cortes)"; "Boys"; "Do You Wanna Come Over?"; "I'm a Slave 4 U"; "Make Me"; "Freakshow"; "Do Somethin'"; "Circus"; "If U Seek Amy"; "Breathe on Me"; "Toxic"; "Stronger"; "(You Drive Me) Crazy"; "Till the World Ends"	

== Benefit events ==
List of benefit events, showing event names, dates, locations, and songs performed
Date	Event	Venue	Location	Performed song(s)	Ref.
September 24, 1999	Rising Star Habitat for Humanity Benefit Concert	Shrine Auditorium	Los Angeles, California	"Soda Pop"; "(You Drive Me) Crazy"	

== Sporting events ==
List of performances at sporting events, with the location and performed songs
Date	Event	Venue	Location	Performed song(s)	Ref.
August 28, 1999	4th Arthur Ashe Kids' Day	Arthur Ashe Stadium	New York City, New York	"(You Drive Me) Crazy"; "Sometimes"; "I Will Be There"; "...Baby One More Time"	
January 28, 2001	Super Bowl XXXV halftime show	Raymond James Stadium	Tampa, Florida	"Walk This Way" (with Aerosmith, NSYNC, Mary J. Blige, and Nelly)	
February 9, 2002	NBA All-Star Read to Achieve Celebration	Pennsylvania Convention Center	Philadelphia, Pennsylvania	"Boys"	
September 4, 2003	2003 NFL Kickoff Live	National Mall	Washington, D.C.	"Me Against the Music"; "...Baby One More Time"/"I'm a Slave 4 U"	
November 11, 2011	2011 Abu Dhabi Grand Prix	Du Arena	Abu Dhabi, United Arab Emirates	"Hold It Against Me"; "Up n' Down"; "3"; "Piece of Me"; "Big Fat Bass"; "How I Roll"; "Lace and Leather"; "If U Seek Amy"; "Gimme More"; "(Drop Dead) Beautiful"; "Don't Let Me Be the Last to Know"; "Boys"; "...Baby One More Time"/"S&M"; "Trouble for Me"; "I'm a Slave 4 U"; "I Wanna Go"; "Womanizer"; "Toxic"; "Till the World Ends"	
October 21, 2018	2018 United States Grand Prix	Austin360 Amphitheater	Austin, Texas	"Work Bitch"; "Womanizer"; "Break the Ice"; "Piece of Me"; "...Baby One More Time"; "Oops!... I Did It Again"; "Me Against the Music"; "Gimme More"; "Clumsy"; "Change Your Mind (No Seas Cortes)"; "Boys"; "Do You Wanna Come Over?"; "I'm a Slave 4 U"; "Make Me"; "Freakshow"; "Do Somethin'"; "Circus"; "If U Seek Amy"; "Breathe on Me"; "Toxic"; "Stronger"; "(You Drive Me) Crazy"; "Till the World Ends"	

== Other performances ==
List of performances at other events, with the location and performed songs
Date	Event	Venue	Location	Performed song(s)	Ref.
April 30, 1999	Disney Grad Nite 1999	Walt Disney World	Hollywood, Florida	"...Baby One More Time"; "Sometimes"	
January 14, 2000	Teen People anniversary party	Vynyl Club	Hollywood, Florida	"...Baby One More Time"; "(You Drive Me) Crazy"; "Born to Make You Happy"	
May 2, 2000	Oops!... I Did It Again promotional show	International Exchange Center	Tokyo, Japan	"(You Drive Me) Crazy"; "Born to Make You Happy"; "Oops!... I Did It Again"; "...Baby One More Time"	
May 6, 2000	Oops!... I Did It Again promotional show	Théâtre de l'Empire	Paris, France	"(You Drive Me) Crazy"; "Born to Make You Happy"; "Oops!... I Did It Again"; "...Baby One More Time"	
March 16, 2002	Walt Disney Studios Park inauguration	Disney Studio 1	Paris, France	"Overprotected"; "I'm Not a Girl, Not Yet a Woman"	
September 14, 2003	In the Zone promotional show	Rain at the Palms	Paradise, Nevada	"Me Against the Music"; "Breathe on Me"; "...Baby One More Time"/"I'm a Slave 4 U"	
October 18, 2003	In the Zone promotional show	Show	New York City, New York	"Me Against the Music"; "Breathe on Me"; "Toxic"	
October 18, 2003	In the Zone promotional show	Splash	New York City, New York	"Boys"/"I'm a Slave 4 U"	
October 18, 2003	In the Zone promotional show	Avalon	New York City, New York	"Toxic"; "Boys"/"I'm a Slave 4 U"; "Me Against the Music"	
December 8, 2003	In the Zone promotional show	Millennium Hall	Seoul, South Korea	"Toxic"; "(I Got That) Boom Boom"; "Boys"/"I'm a Slave 4 U"; "Me Against the Music"	
December 14, 2003	In the Zone promotional show	The Garden Hall	Tokyo, Japan	"Toxic"; "Breathe on Me"; "Me Against the Music"	

== Guest appearances ==
List of appearances as featured act, showing main artist, dates, locations, and performed songs
Date	Artist	Event	Location	Performed song(s)	Ref.
November 6, 2008	Madonna	Sticky & Sweet Tour	Los Angeles, California (Dodger Stadium)	"Human Nature" (with Madonna)	

== Canceled performances ==
List of planned shows, showing scheduled dates, location(s), number of shows, and reason for cancellation
Scheduled dates	Title	Location(s)	Shows	Reason	Ref.
February 13 – August 17, 2019	Britney: Domination	Paradise, Nevada (Park Theater)	32	Indefinite work hiatus	
