= The Circus Starring Britney Spears =

2009 concert tour by Britney Spears

- Tour by Britney Spears
- Promotional poster for the tour
- Location: Europe; North America; Oceania
- Associated album: Circus
- Start date: March 3, 2009
- End date: November 29, 2009
- Legs: 4
- No. of shows: 97
- Supporting acts: Cascada; Ciara; DJ Havana Brown; Girlicious; Jordin Sparks; Kristinia DeBarge; One Call; Slimmy; the Pussycat Dolls
- Attendance: 1.4 million
- Box office: US$131.8 million (Note: US$197.79 million in 2025 dollars.)

Britney Spears concert chronology
- The M+M's Tour (2007); The Circus Starring Britney Spears (2009); Femme Fatale Tour (2011)

The Circus Starring Britney Spears, commonly referred to as the Circus Tour, was the seventh concert tour by American entertainer Britney Spears. It was launched in support of her sixth studio album, Circus (2008). Rumors of a tour arose as early as October 2007, however, nothing was confirmed until December 2008, when the tour was officially announced, with North American and European dates revealed. The stage was composed of three rings and set in-the-round to resemble an actual circus. Fashion designers Dean and Dan Caten created the costumes. A giant cylinder screen was set above the stage to showcase videos and backdrops. Effects were provided by Solotech. Magician Ed Alonzo joined Spears during the second act. The setlist was composed generally from her albums In the Zone, Blackout, and Circus. Spears announced she would tour Australia for the first time in June 2009.

The Circus Starring Britney Spears was described as a "pop extravaganza". It was divided into five segments. The Circus featured a metamorphosis of Spears from a ringmaster to a slave, while being surrounded by different performers. House of Fun (Anything Goes) displayed a series of upbeat numbers with different themes, including magic and military. It ended with a Bollywood-inspired performance and a ballad in which Spears performed while floating on a giant umbrella. Freakshow/Peepshow featured a video interlude set to heavy metal music, and continued with dark and sexual performances. Electro Circ displayed energetic dance routines, and the encore consisted of a video montage of Spears's music videos and a police-themed performance. Some changes were made to the show throughout the tour. Several songs were remixed; Spears also performed "Mannequin" in selected European shows and covers of Duffy and Alanis Morissette songs on some North American dates.

The Circus Starring Britney Spears received mixed to positive reviews from critics. While some praised its aesthetics and deemed it an entertaining show, others criticized Spears' lack of involvement during some segments. The tour was a commercial success, with a total gross of $131.8 million, making it Spears' highest-grossing tour and the fifth highest-grossing tour of 2009. A great number of tickets were sold within a week of the tour's announcement, which prompted supporters to add more dates. The tour also broke attendance records in many cities and all the North American shows were sold out.

== Background ==
On September 9, 2007, Spears performed "Gimme More", the lead single from her fifth studio album Blackout (2007) at the MTV Video Music Awards. Her last live performance had been during The M+M's Tour in May of the same year. Her singing, her dancing and even her wardrobe were all commented on extensively, and it was considered hurtful for her career. In October 2007, it was reported that Spears was planning to go on tour to promote the album and was holding open dance auditions, but this was later denied by Jive Records. In February 2008, similar reports surfaced that Spears had already rehearsed in private for a month at Millennium Dance Complex in Los Angeles, and would be leaving to Europe during the following weeks for a worldwide tour. However, it was finally cancelled for unknown reasons. In September 2008, after New York City radio station Z100 premiered her single "Womanizer", Spears made a surprise appearance on the show and announced she would be going on a worldwide tour during 2009 to support her sixth studio album, Circus (2008). The concert promoter was AEG Live. Former director of the tour, Australian choreographer Wade Robson, said that the tour would visit the United States, the United Kingdom, and would also reach Australia.

After her live performances in the Big Apple Circus tent at Lincoln Center for Good Morning America on December 2, 2008, Spears officially announced a first leg of twenty-five dates in the US and two dates in the UK, with the tour launching on March 3, 2009, in New Orleans. Big Apple Circus performers supported Spears during her performance, and ultimately went on to open for her throughout the tour. The Pussycat Dolls were also selected in October 2008 as the opening act of the first North American leg. Spears's manager Larry Rudolph claimed that the show would "blow people's minds and promises to show Britney's fans something they will never forget." He later added, "she goes full-speed the whole show – about an hour and a half. It's pretty intense. This is a full-blown, full-out Britney Spears show. It is a pop extravaganza. It is everything everybody expects from her — and more!" On April 28, 2009, eight European dates were added. The following day, four more dates were announced in Russia, Poland and Germany. On June 9, 2009, Spears announced that she would tour Australia for the first time in November. Six dates were initially announced. Spears stated, "I've wanted to tour Australia for quite some time and now it's finally happening. My Circus tour is the best show I have ever created and I can't wait to perform it for all of my Australian fans. See you guys soon!" The following day, it was announced on her official website that she would return to North America for a second leg, visiting twenty cities. The Circus Starring Britney Spears was also rumored to reach South America, however, Spears's manager Adam Leber denied this despite their efforts to do so.

== Development ==
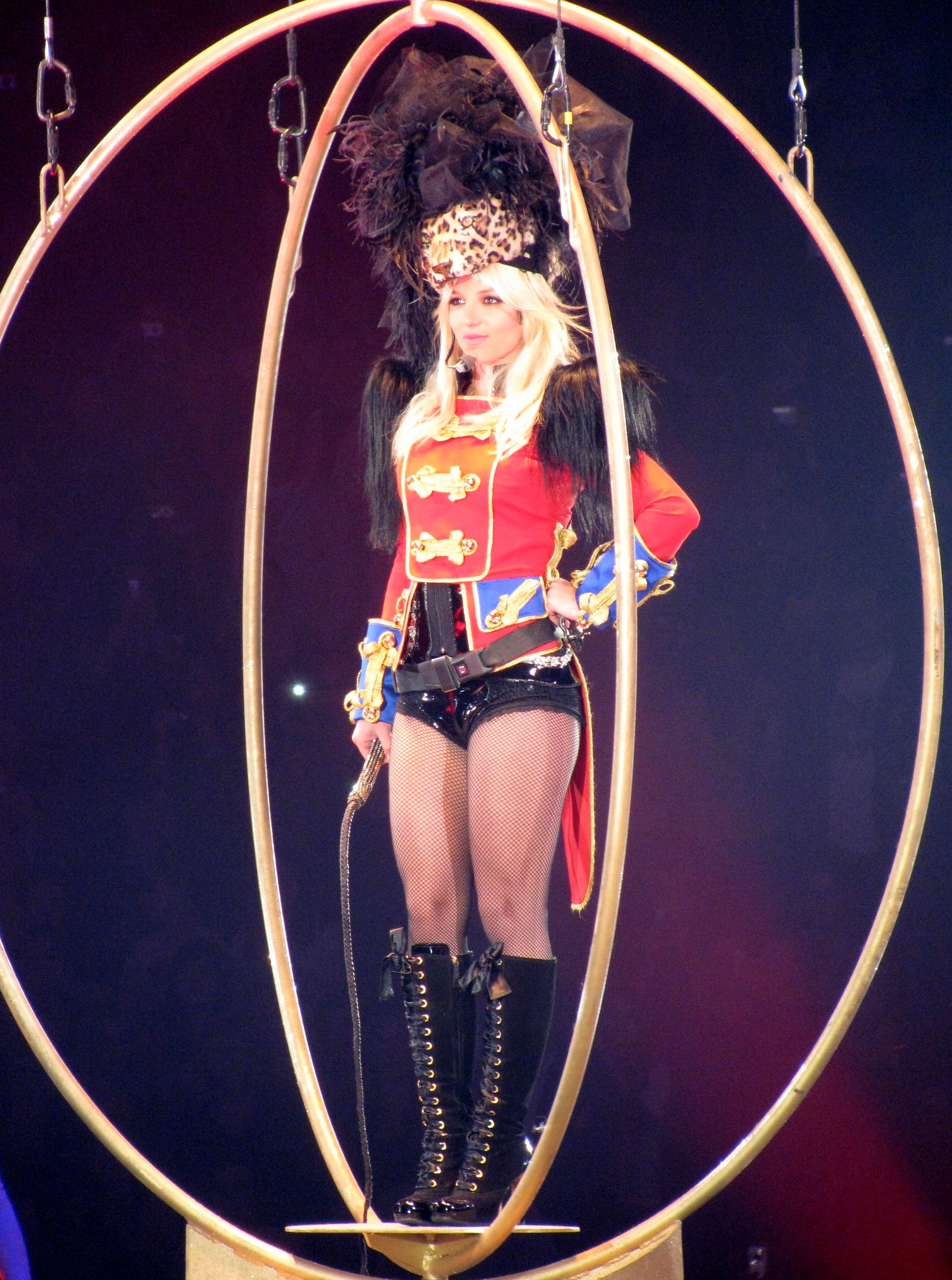
Spears performing "Circus" as the opening song

The choreographer was Jamie King, who previously collaborated with Spears in her Oops!... I Did It Again Tour. He did the casting of the dancers and acrobats, and worked with Spears on the setlist and the choreography. Simon Ellis was hired as the musical director. The production design was done by Road Rage, a formed alliance between Nick Whitehouse, Bryan Leitch, William Baker and Steve Dixon. Lightning design was done by Visual Light, conformed by Whitehouse and Leitch. The stage was designed by Road Rage and set in-the-round, with a big stage in the center painted to look like a target. There were also two satellite stages in the sides unified by small catwalks, to resemble an actual three-ring circus. The stage was built by Tait Towers and included nine lifts, which had a cost of $10 million. It traveled in 3,000 rolling cases packed into 32 semis and a crew of 150 people was needed to set it up. There was a semi-transparent Element Labs Stealth cylinder screen above the stage, comprising 960 panels that Solotech built into custom frames. The backdrops & projection content were designed by Dirk Decloedt. There were three new film sequences shot exclusively for the tour: an opening video featuring Perez Hilton, a video of Spears set to Marilyn Manson's "Sweet Dreams (Are Made of This)" and a final montage. The three videos were created by Veneno. Props, including swings, couches, unicycles, stripper poles, a gold cage and giant picture frames, were designed by ShowFX Inc.; they also provided custom VIP couch seating that lined the perimeter of the stage. VYV provided the video control, which included two Photon Show media servers and two Photon Controllers. The servers took timecode for the show and wrapped the images around the Stealth screen. Emric Epstein of VYV explained, "The servers and software permits us to control a large number of video layers on the 360˚ LED screen, composite the layers in realtime, and transform the final output so that everything look seamless after going through the LED controllers. There is also an astounding 3D preview of the stage and video screens in the software so you can control or re-program the show without being inside the arena bowl".

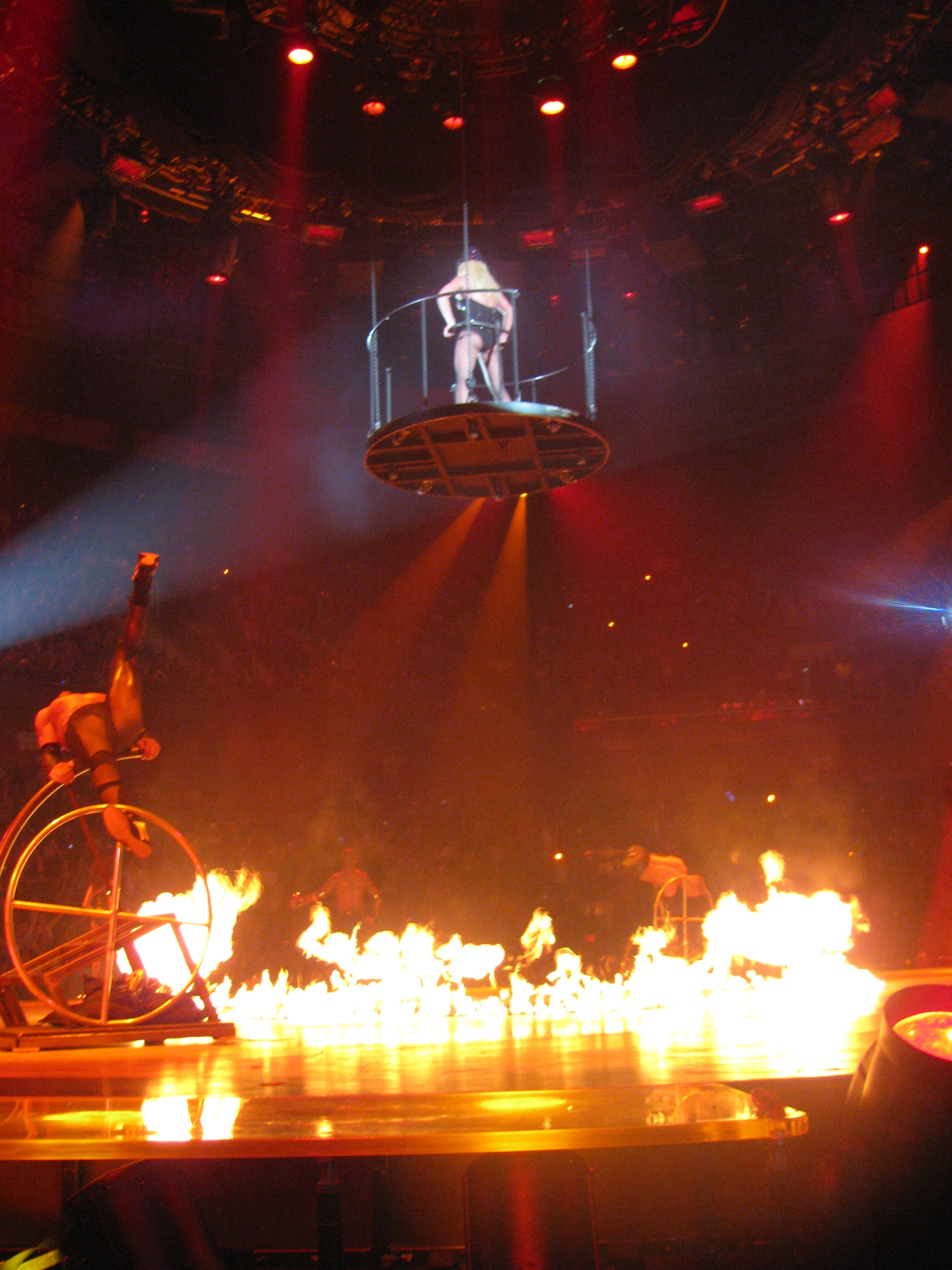
Spears being lifted into the air in a platform, with a ring of fire in the main stage, during a performance of "I'm a Slave 4 U"

The sound was provided by Solotech. Front of house engineer Blake Suib explained that, "[Me] and Solotech were asked to come up with a design that blocked the fewest seats but provided the quality and coverage that [Spears] expects and that we were looking for". The public address (PA) was made of 64 Milos that split into four hangs of 16 per hang. Two at the 50 yard line pointed one way and directly behind, two at the 50 yard line pointed the opposite way. Also present were 32 Micas; 16 per hang, pointing to the sides. Each one of the four hangs had its own equalization (EQ) and level control, so in case one of the speakers were louder there would be a separate EQ to compensate for any change in the tone due to the distance. All the components and tools used in the public address were designed by Meyer Sound Laboratories, including a software called Mapp, used to decide where to point the PA; the Simm, to analyze and time align the PA accurately; and the Galileo, used to EQ and balance all the sections of the PA. The speakers were self-powered with amplifiers also built by Meyer Sounds. There were 24 HP700 subwoofers positioned all over the arena floor, and the Simm and Galileo were used to time align. Spears used a Crown CM-311AE headset microphone wearing the mic's beltpack (usually hidden in color matching material) on her top or pants, she did not use in-ear monitors; instead 12 Meyer CQs were positioned, eight flown around the center ring and two on each of the smaller stages. Spears specifically asked Suib to make the show sound similar to a dance club. Solotech provided the lighting package, including a mostly Vari-Lite rig, with 80 each VL3000s and VL3500s in various positions, and 60 VL500s built into the stage deck. Whitehouse also had 18 PRG Bad Boy luminaires, 16 of which sat in pods that hung in various positions lower than the rest of the rig, with two more at either end of the stage. Each of the eight pods housed two Bad Boys, two of the VL3500s, one Robert Juliat Ivanhoe followspot with scroller under DMX control, and a Molefay. Fifty Martin Professional Atomic Color strobes and four front of house Robert Juliat Aramis followspots rounded out the lighting package. The lightning team had to rehearse for a month to prepare. The tour was also the first to use the touring version of the PRG Virtuoso V676 console to control the system, which was used from the beginning of the European leg until the end of the tour. Pyrotechnics and jets of smoke used in the show were created by Lorenzo Cornacchia of Pyrotek Special Effects and Tait Towers.

Spears explained that since she did not tour to promote Blackout, she was excited about having to include songs from that album into the setlist. The finished setlist would include three songs from Circus, six songs from Blackout and five songs from In the Zone (2003); other parts of the setlist consist of a medley of "Breathe on Me" and "Touch of My Hand", both from In the Zone; and a remix of "...Baby One More Time", the only song performed off the album of the same name (1998). "Everytime" was the only song not included in the released setlist but was performed regularly on the show. Magician Ed Alonzo joined Spears in one of the acts, and she played as his assistant. Alonzo stated, "We're going to be doing the classics of magic but a little high-tech. We'll be doing a little dissection, transposition, a vanish, an appearance — and if I do a trick, she doesn't just hold the props, she's actually getting inside the big boxes or I am slicing her up. ... Some of it's pretty scary, but she gets right in there with no reservations." The costumes were designed by Dean and Dan Caten from DSquared2. They recreated classic circus outfits, like clowns, jugglers and trapeze artists in a more provocative way. They commented that,

"We are enormous fans of Britney, and have been waiting for the perfect moment to collaborate with her. It's going to be wild. We wanted to create something much more provoking and indecent ... something animalistic and primal. We are confident that this tour partnership, an autobiographical tribute for one who has always been in the spotlight: scrutinized, watched, imitated, photographed, criticized and loved, will be an enormous success".

The costumes of the first segment were selected to show a metamorphosis. The cheetah headdress represented an animal. The jacket and whip represented both a ringmaster and a lion tamer. She took the headdress off at the end of the first song to reveal a Swarovski-crystal corset, fishnets, and boots and entered the cage to represent a slave. The wardrobe for the song "Mannequin" included black jeans from True Religion and a yellow tank top with rhinestones designed by Spears herself. Spears's outfits had a duplicate set in case of any problem and were numbered in sequence. The total number of costumes was approximately 350, kept in order by six full-time women. The wardrobe was also revealed to have $150,000 worth of Swarovski crystals.

== Concert synopsis ==
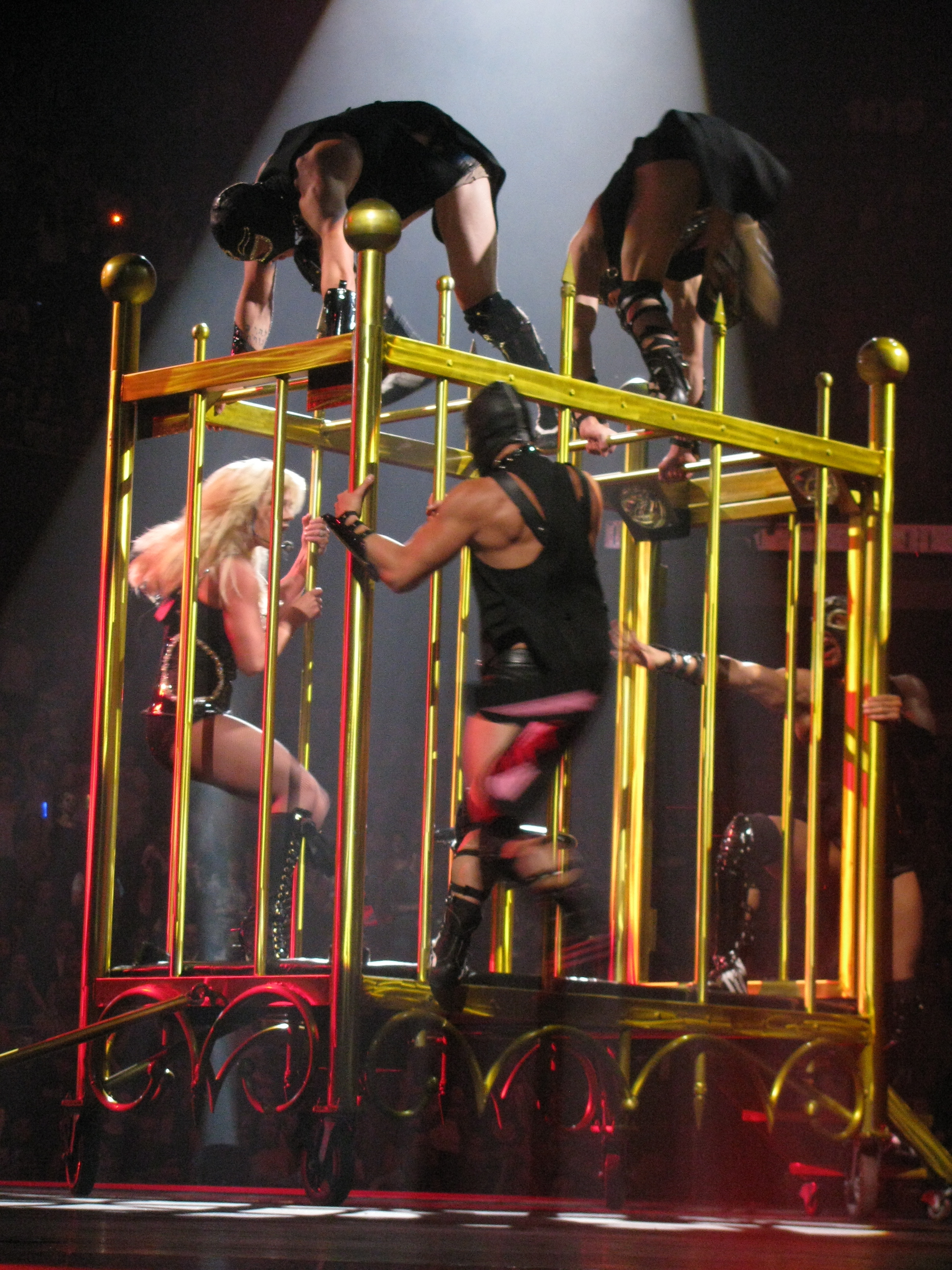
Spears performing "Piece of Me" inside a cage while her dancers chase her

The show was mainly divided into four acts with different themes: The Circus, House of Fun (Anything Goes), Freakshow–Peepshow, Electro Circ and ended with the encore. It began with "Welcome to the Circus", a video introduction featuring Perez Hilton as Queen Elizabeth I. In the middle of the video, the cylinder screen started to rise, while Spears appeared on the video and shot Hilton with a crossbow, causing him to fall backwards onto the floor. As the video ended, Spears descended from the ceiling on a suspended platform, wearing the headdress, a ringmaster jacket, black shorts, high-heeled boots and carrying a whip. She started with a performance of "Circus", which featured acrobats taking the stage and spun on giant rings in the air. The song ended with Spears taking off her ringleader jacket to reveal the Swarovski-crystal corset and running into the center of the main stage, as she was surrounded by jets of smoke. She entered a golden cage, where she performed "Piece of Me", dancing and attempting to escape from her dancers. A brief interlude followed, featuring a performance by acrobats twirling from suspended fabric, simulating a thunderstorm. before Spears went into "Radar" which featured her pole dancing on each of the stage's rings.

The first intermezzo showcased her dancers doing a martial arts inspired dance to the LAZRtag remix of "Gimme More". In the next section, Ed Alonzo took the stage and Spears played his assistant in "Ooh Ooh Baby" entering a box and being sawed in half. After she came out, she entered another box in the middle of the stage and the performance ended with Alonzo dropping the curtains and showing that Spears had escaped from it, while the top of the box exploded in a shower of sparks. At the same time, Spears reappeared with four female dancers in one of the satellite stages, dancing to "Hot as Ice". The next song was the Co-Ed Remix of "Boys", which Spears performed wearing a military costume, while surrounded by her dancers, some of them riding bicycles. At the end of the song she performed a military drill with her male dancers before moving into "If U Seek Amy", which featured her pushing them with a giant pink mallet, in a similar way to Whac-A-Mole. After a brief interlude, she returned to continue the act with a Bollywood-inspired remix of "Me Against the Music". She briefly talked with the audience before she sat on a giant umbrella and was lifted into the air to perform "Everytime".

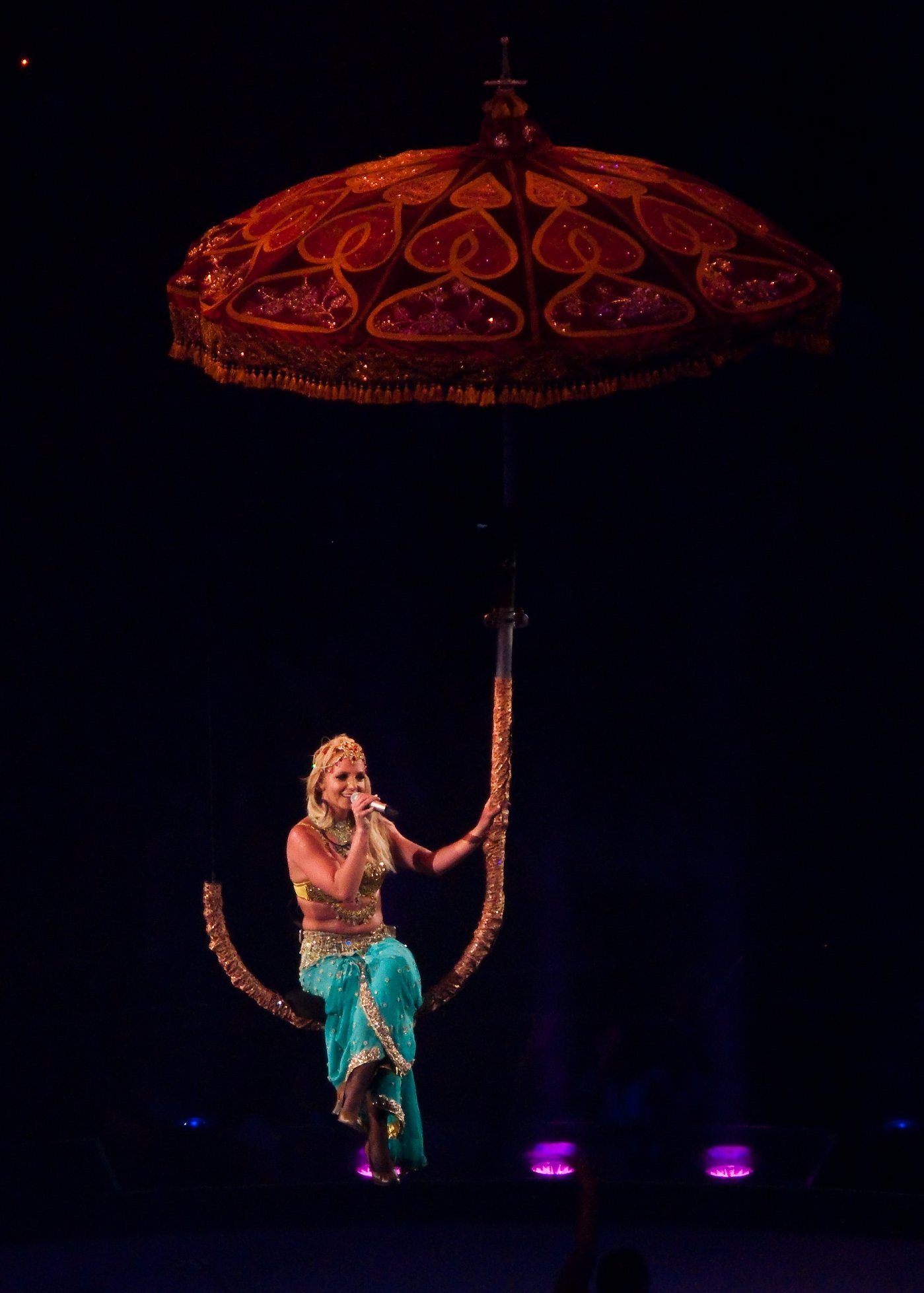
The performance of "Everytime" in the Bollywood-inspired segment of the show

The show continued with a video interlude featuring Marilyn Manson's cover of "Sweet Dreams (Are Made of This)", showing Spears in a classically decadent party-setting, in which everyone except her was wearing masks. A distorted voice welcomed spectators to the third act and Spears appeared onstage to perform "Freakshow" and "Get Naked (I Got a Plan)". A video spoofing late-night chat lines featuring "Britney's Hotline" played, while clowns took a person from the audience and goofed around with them. Spears returned to perform "Breathe on Me", dancing on a giant picture frame, and "Touch of My Hand", in which she sported a blindfold while being lifted on the air sitting in the backs of two aerialists. In the fourth section, there was a band interlude, and Spears appeared on stage to perform "Do Somethin'", with a gun that shot sparks in her hand. This was followed by a remix of "I'm a Slave 4 U", in which she was raised on a platform as a ring of fire started below her. In the "Heartbeat" interlude, the dancers showcased their individual moves. Spears performed "Toxic" with moving jungle gyms and surrounded by green sci-fi lightning effects. The act ended with Spears and her dancers performing a remix of "...Baby One More Time". After a brief pause, the encore began with the "Break the Ice" video interlude, which included various clips of Spears's music videos. Spears returned for a performance of "Womanizer" dressed as a policewoman. Spears and the dancers bowed to each side of the arena and left with "Circus" playing in the background.

Some changes were made to the setlist throughout the tour. During opening night in New Orleans, Spears was supposed to perform a cover of Duffy's "I'm Scared" after "Everytime". However, the lyric sheet went missing onstage and she started performing from below the stage, leaving two backup singers in the main stage. It was later dropped from the show. "Mannequin" was added on the second Paris date and performed after "Get Naked (I Got a Plan)", with a brief lightshow introduction. The song was performed until July 26, 2009. A cover of "You Oughta Know" by Alanis Morissette was performed on select shows during the second North American leg, starting on September 5, 2009. In addition, "Piece of Me", "Radar", "Ooh Ooh Baby", "Do Somethin'", "I'm a Slave 4 U", "...Baby One More Time" and "Womanizer" were remixed at the beginning of the European leg.

On the Vancouver stop of the tour, the concert was interrupted for 30 minutes due to the strong marijuana smoke. Years later, in 2021, it has been alleged by one of the background dancers that Spears herself stopped the show and refused to go back, citing fears of marijuana appearing on drug tests she is routinely submitted to under her court-appointed conservatorship, leading to her losing custody of her children. Regardless, she was allegedly "dragged by her arms" to complete the concert.

== Critical reception ==
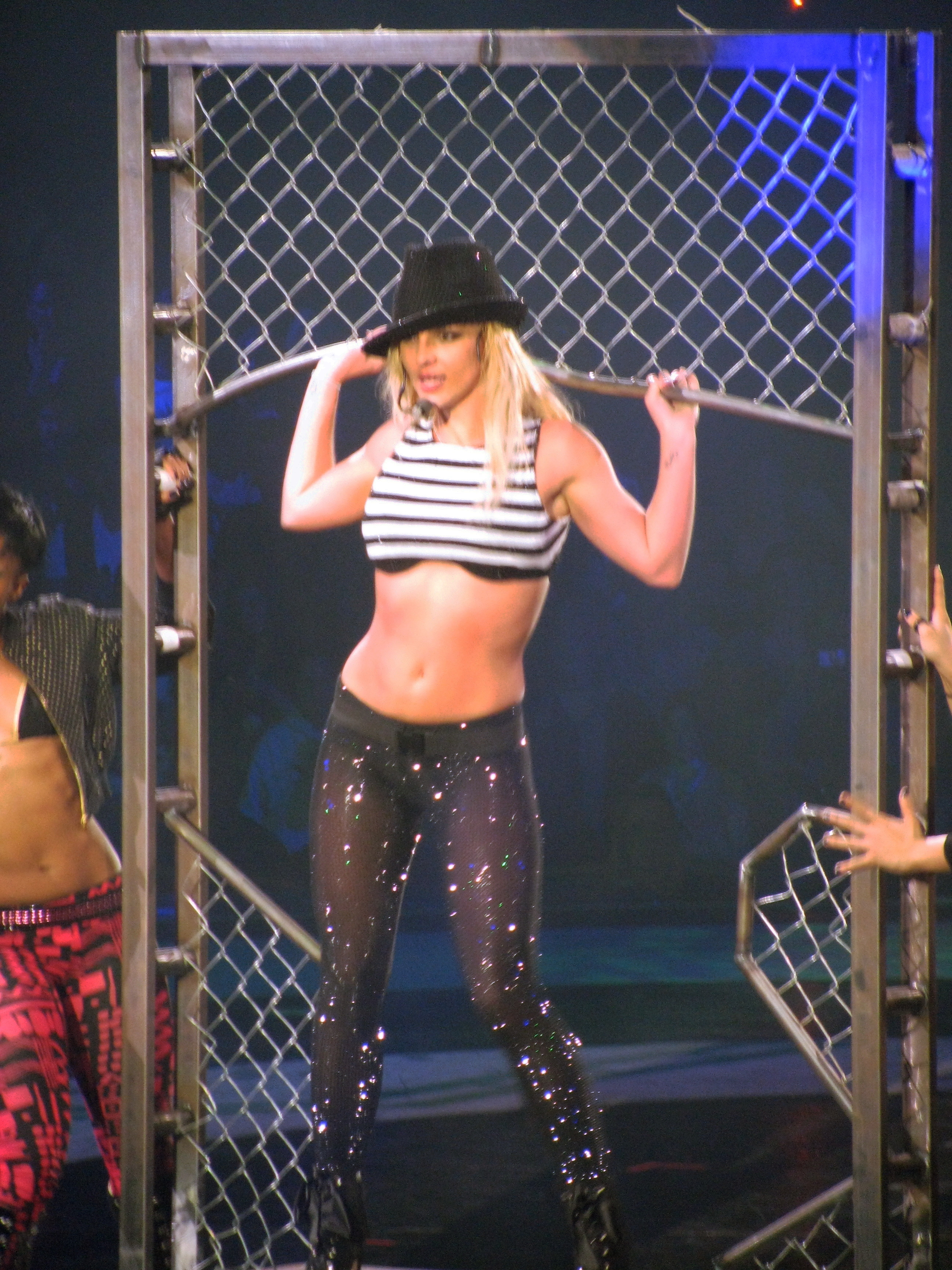
Spears performing "Toxic" during the Electro Circ segment of the show in Boston

After Spears's premiere performance, the tour received mixed to positive reviews from critics. Stacey Plaisance of the Associated Press commented that the tour was "another strong step in the right direction" and that Spears delivered "a tightly choreographed, if perfunctory performance". Ann Powers of the Los Angeles Times stated, "despite that first-night stumble and several numbers in which her dancing was no more than adequate, Spears can safely call this performance a success". Jon Caramanica of The New York Times said that "[the show] was less a concert than a Las Vegas-style revue of intimidating complexity. Throughout, though she spoke little, Ms. Spears appeared radiant and unfettered, often smiling and never uncommitted". Dixie Reid of The Sacramento Bee commented that the show was "a mesmerizingly big production with entertaining videos (including the infamous Spears-Madonna kiss), confetti, sparklers and even a stilt-walker. Who could ask for more? Everyone seemed to have a good time at the circus". Neil McCormick of The Daily Telegraph said Spears is "the queen of production line pop and reclaims that diamanté crown with the most perfectly plastic pop show ever staged".

People writer Chuck Arnold wrote that Spears "never really hit her old stride [..] there was a lot more strutting than real choreographic feats from [her]". Jeff Montgomery of MTV both praised and dismissed Spears's performance saying, "Yes, welcome to Britney's Circus, a big, huge, loud, funny, nonsensical three-ring affair... She looks great in her myriad of outfits, and she can still move with the best of them. [...] It's just, well, she's almost lost in the sheer hugeness of the production around her". Jane Stevenson of Toronto Sun gave Spears's performance three out of five stars stating there was "so much was going on – there were also martial artists, bicyclists, etc. – there was no time to really assess Spears other than to note that she looked great. [..] She could lip-synch the words (one can assume) and strut around the stage well enough, but there was little in the way of genuine passion, joy, or excitement on her part". The Hollywood Reporter's Craig Rosen claimed that "in the end, Britney and company delivered an entertaining spectacle, but one couldn't help but wish that she would strip it all down and show a little more of herself". Sean Daly of St. Petersburg Times summed up all the reviews by stating, "When Britney, touring behind her new Circus album, plays the Times Forum, there will be as many people rooting for her success as her failure. [..] But in the end, we're all envious and thankful, jealous and applauding. We like them/us and hate them/us for the very same reasons".

== Commercial response ==
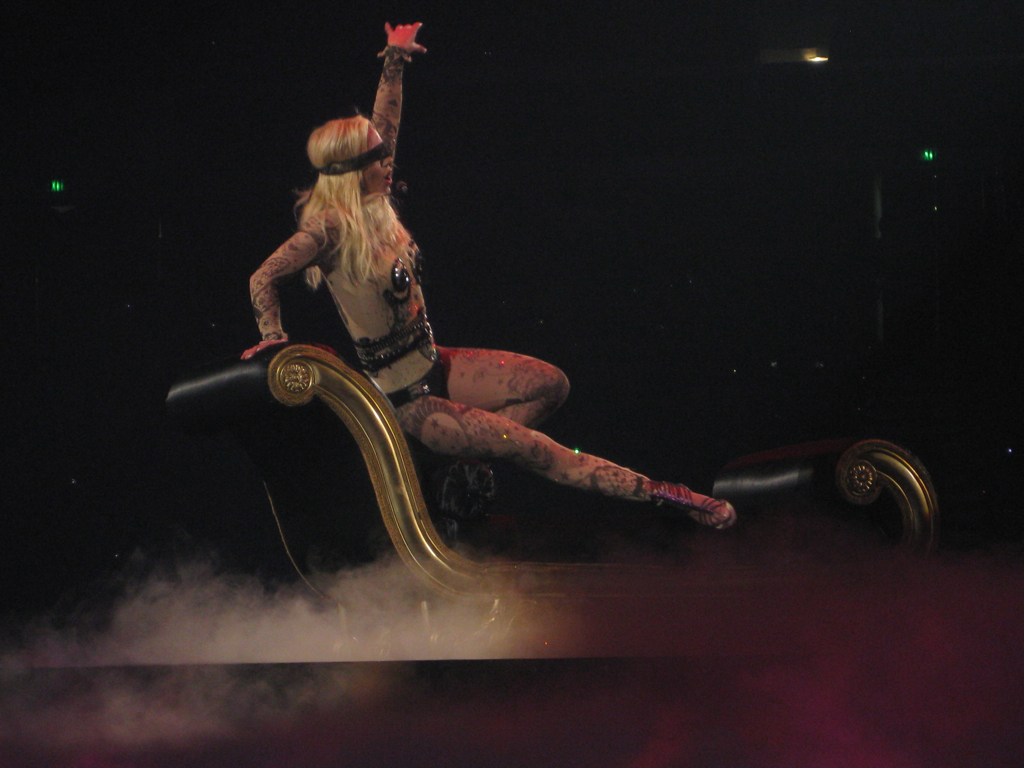
Spears performing "Touch of My Hand" in Sacramento

A week after the tour was announced, 400,000 tickets were purchased for the North American shows, which prompted promoters to add seven more dates in Los Angeles, Toronto, New Jersey, Chicago, Long Island, Anaheim and Montreal. Due to demand in the UK, six more shows were added to the initial two, selling more than 100,000 tickets in a week. Spears performance at the American Airlines Arena broke the attendance record previously held by Celine Dion, with a crowd of 18,644 people. The first North American leg, which was sold out, resulted in an average of 20,498 tickets per show and a gross of $61.6 million, becoming the highest-grossing tour of the first semester of 2009 in the continent. In addition, the tour grossed $13 million from the London, Manchester and Dublin shows, with a total gross of $74.6 million, ranking as the third highest-grossing tour worldwide. The Copenhagen show at Parken Stadium gathered 40,000 people, Spears's largest audience since her 2002 concerts in Mexico City.

The second North American leg was also sold out, with a gross of $21.4 million and it was reported that the tour had grossed $94 million. Her first three shows in Melbourne were also sold out. The four shows at Acer Arena in Sydney sold 66,247 tickets, making Spears the highest-selling act ever in the arena. The tour was ranked at number seven on Billboard's Top 25 Tours of 2009, with a previously reported gross of $94 million. However, only 70 of the 97 shows were counted. The Circus Starring Britney Spears also made Spears rank at number twenty one on the Top Touring Artists of the Decade, becoming the youngest artist in the list and also the fourth female artist, behind Madonna, Celine Dion and Cher. The tour was also ranked as the fourth highest-grossing tour of the year in North America, becoming the highest-grossing tour of the year by a solo artist. In February 2010, Pollstar released their Top 50 Worldwide Concert Tours of 2009. The tour ranked as the fifth highest-grossing tour of the year, with a gross of $131.8 million and 1,406,466 tickets sold.

== Australian leg controversies ==
Before the first of the Australian shows, Minister for Fair Trading for New South Wales Virginia Judge, said she was aware that Spears would lipsync during the concerts and was considering to include disclaimers on promotional materials and tickets, indicating that portions of the show would be pre-recorded. These measures would mean a change in the country's legislation similar to the debacle of the 2008 Summer Olympics opening ceremony. Judge further explained her position saying, "Let's be clear – live means live. If you are spending up to $200 I think you deserve better than a film clip". Tour director Steve Dixon defended Spears, claiming, "This is a pop spectacular, this is a showband show. You come for the experience. There is a lot to see about this show, there's nothing like this in the world. Britney Spears will entertain you, that's what people come for. We absolutely give them a show". After opening night in Perth, The Advertiser writer Rebekah Devlin reported that a number of fans had walked out of the show. They were apparently "disappointed" and "outraged" regarding Spears's lip syncing and subdued dancing. Australian tour promoter Paul Dainty talked about the situation saying,

"It's the biggest lie I've ever heard. I'm so angry. We can take heat if there's something wrong and people can review shows badly – that's something you have to live with – but to say people stormed out of the show was an absolute fabrication. Britney is aware of all this and she's extremely upset by it. She's a human being. I'm embarrassed, with such a big international entourage here with Britney, to be part of the Australian media when I see that kind of totally inaccurate reporting. It's been all over the internet for nine months, the inference is that we tried to hide this. It's been the opposite. This show is about an incredible spectacle, which it is".

Spears's manager Adam Leber responded in his Twitter account, saying, "It's unfortunate that one journalist in Perth didn't enjoy the show last night. Fortunately the other 18,272 fans in attendance did". Spears's official website also posted a list of positive reviews from a number of fans. Burswood Dome also issued a statament reading, "Last night's concert (Friday) saw record crowds turn out for her first performance in Perth and from Burswood's perspective the event was a huge success. Early media reports that hundreds of fans left the concert early cannot be substantiated and Burswood has received no complaints about the concert". Finally, Spears addressed the situation according to BBC Online. She was quoted as saying, "I hear there is a lot of controversy in the media about my show. Some reporters have said they love it and some don't. I came to Australia for my fans". The negative media attention continued after her show in Melbourne when it was alleged that fans had placed tickets for the remaining Australian shows on sale on the online shopping website eBay, for as little as 99 cents. However, Dainty said that the holders of the tickets were not Spears's fans, stating "They're just profiteers. They buy tickets for $200 and think they (sic) that when the concerts sell-out they will offload them for $500".

== Broadcast and recordings ==
During the tour, there was a suggestion that the shows in Las Vegas on September 26, 27, 2009 would be recorded for a future release. Professional footage also surfaced online of the performance of "Circus", broadcast by Yahoo!, from the Copenhagen show. On November 12, 2009, Spears's manager, Adam Leber, posted on his Twitter account that there were "...No plans for a Circus Tour DVD at the moment."

== Set list ==
The following set list is representative of the show on March 3, 2009. It is not representative of all concerts for the duration of the tour.

Act 1: Circus

1. "Circus"
2. "Piece of Me"
3. "Radar"

Act 2: House of Fun (Anything Goes)

4. "Ooh Ooh Baby" / "Hot as Ice"
5. "Boys"
6. "If U Seek Amy"
7. "Me Against the Music" (Bollywood Remix)
8. "Everytime"

Act 3: Freakshow/Peepshow

9. "Freakshow"
10. "Get Naked (I Got a Plan)"
11. "Breathe on Me" / "Touch of My Hand"

Act 4: Electro Circ

12. "Do Somethin'"
13. "I'm a Slave 4 U"
14. "Toxic"
15. "...Baby One More Time"

Encore

16. "Womanizer" (Extended Remix)

Notes

- "Everytime" was not included in the official set list posted on the singer's website right before the tour kicked off, but it was performed in every show.
- A cover of Duffy's "I'm Scared" was performed on the tour's opening night.
- "Mannequin" was performed on select European concerts dates.
- A cover of Alanis Morissette's "You Oughta Know" was performed during select concerts during the second North American leg.
- "Touch of My Hand" was not performed at most concerts from the European leg, second North American leg and the entire Australian leg.

== Shows ==
List of concerts, showing date, city, country, venue, opening act, tickets sold, number of available tickets and amount of gross revenue
Date (2009)	City	Country	Venue	Opening act	Attendance	Revenue
March 3	New Orleans	United States	New Orleans Arena	The Pussycat Dolls	16,810 / 16,810	$1,604,815
March 5	Atlanta	United States	Philips Arena	The Pussycat Dolls	17,194 / 17,194	$1,695,449
March 7	Miami	United States	American Airlines Arena	The Pussycat Dolls	18,644 / 18,644	$1,972,928
March 8	Tampa	United States	St. Pete Times Forum	The Pussycat Dolls	18,929 / 18,929	$1,818,011
March 11	Uniondale	United States	Nassau Coliseum	The Pussycat Dolls	33,549 / 33,549 (Note: The score data is combined from the shows held at the Nassau Coliseum on March 11 and 23, respectively.)	$3,623,790
March 13	Newark	United States	Prudential Center	The Pussycat Dolls	33,535 / 33,535	$3,865,005
March 14	Newark	United States	Prudential Center	The Pussycat Dolls	33,535 / 33,535	$3,865,005
March 16	Boston	United States	TD Banknorth Garden	The Pussycat Dolls	15,659 / 15,659	$1,909,235
March 18	Toronto	Canada	Air Canada Centre	The Pussycat Dolls	37,912 / 37,912	$3,714,316
March 19	Toronto	Canada	Air Canada Centre	The Pussycat Dolls	37,912 / 37,912	$3,714,316
March 20	Montreal	Canada	Bell Centre	The Pussycat Dolls	21,234 / 21,234	$1,911,733
March 23	Uniondale	United States	Nassau Coliseum	—N/a		
March 24	Washington, D.C.	United States	Verizon Center	The Pussycat Dolls	18,160 / 18,160	$1,859,147
March 27	Pittsburgh	United States	Mellon Arena	The Pussycat Dolls	16,146 / 16,146	$1,553,944
March 30	Houston	United States	Toyota Center	The Pussycat Dolls	16,604 / 16,604	$1,749,704
March 31	Dallas	United States	American Airlines Center	The Pussycat Dolls	17,869 / 17,869	$1,830,923
April 2	Kansas City	United States	Sprint Center	The Pussycat Dolls	16,872 / 16,872	$1,567,486
April 3	Minneapolis	United States	Target Center	The Pussycat Dolls	17,694 / 17,694	$1,420,032
April 6	Edmonton	Canada	Rexall Place	The Pussycat Dolls	17,109 / 17,109	$1,422,220
April 8	Vancouver	Canada	General Motors Place	The Pussycat Dolls	18,040 / 18,040	$1,552,132
April 9	Tacoma	United States	Tacoma Dome	The Pussycat Dolls	21,828 / 21,828	$1,694,410
April 11	Sacramento	United States	ARCO Arena	The Pussycat Dolls	15,975 / 15,975	$1,293,323
April 12	San Jose	United States	HP Pavilion	The Pussycat Dolls	17,869 / 17,869	$1,834,352
April 14	Salt Lake City	United States	EnergySolutions Arena	The Pussycat Dolls	17,095 / 17,095	$1,076,551
April 16	Los Angeles	United States	Staples Center	The Pussycat Dolls	33,142 / 33,142	$4,062,953
April 17	Los Angeles	United States	Staples Center	The Pussycat Dolls	33,142 / 33,142	$4,062,953
April 19	Anaheim	United States	Honda Center	The Pussycat Dolls	31,582 / 31,582	$3,081,963
April 20	Anaheim	United States	Honda Center	The Pussycat Dolls	31,582 / 31,582	$3,081,963
April 22	Oakland	United States	Oracle Arena	The Pussycat Dolls	17,694 / 17,694	$1,310,285
April 24	Glendale	United States	Jobing.com Arena	The Pussycat Dolls	17,005 / 17,005	$1,769,063
April 25	Paradise (Note: Labelled as Las Vegas on promotional material)	United States	MGM Grand Garden Arena	The Pussycat Dolls	15,728 / 15,728	$2,482,352
April 28	Rosemont	United States	Allstate Arena	The Pussycat Dolls	32,942 / 32,942	$3,194,384
April 29	Rosemont	United States	Allstate Arena	The Pussycat Dolls	32,942 / 32,942	$3,194,384
April 30	Columbus	United States	Schottenstein Center	The Pussycat Dolls	17,221 / 17,221	$1,434,383
May 2	Uncasville	United States	Mohegan Sun Arena	The Pussycat Dolls	18,611 / 18,611	$2,349,446
May 3 (Note: The show on May 3, 2009 at the Mohegan Sun Arena was originally scheduled to take place on March 26, 2009, but was postponed due to logistics conflict.)	Uncasville	United States	Mohegan Sun Arena	The Pussycat Dolls	18,611 / 18,611	$2,349,446
May 5	Montreal	Canada	Bell Centre	Girlicious	11,475 / 11,475	$1,064,925
June 3	London	England	The O_{2} Arena	Ciara	139,778 / 139,778	$9,959,306
June 4	London	England	The O_{2} Arena	Ciara	139,778 / 139,778	$9,959,306
June 6	London	England	The O_{2} Arena	Ciara	139,778 / 139,778	$9,959,306
June 7	London	England	The O_{2} Arena	Ciara	139,778 / 139,778	$9,959,306
June 10	London	England	The O_{2} Arena	Ciara	139,778 / 139,778	$9,959,306
June 11	London	England	The O_{2} Arena	Ciara	139,778 / 139,778	$9,959,306
June 13	London	England	The O_{2} Arena	Ciara	139,778 / 139,778	$9,959,306
June 14	London	England	The O_{2} Arena	Ciara	139,778 / 139,778	$9,959,306
June 17	Manchester	England	MEN Arena	—N/a	14,232 / 15,626	$1,196,813
June 19	Dublin	Ireland	The O_{2}	—N/a	15,491 / 19,429	$2,336,634
June 20	Dublin	Ireland	The O_{2}	—N/a	15,491 / 19,429	$2,336,634
July 4	Paris	France	Palais Omnisports de Paris-Bercy	Slimmy	46,602 / 51,000	$5,260,236
July 5	Paris	France	Palais Omnisports de Paris-Bercy	Slimmy	46,602 / 51,000	$5,260,236
July 6	Paris	France	Palais Omnisports de Paris-Bercy	Slimmy	46,602 / 51,000	$5,260,236
July 9	Antwerp	Belgium	Sportpaleis	DJ Havana Brown	15,842 / 17,029	$1,628,583
July 11	Copenhagen	Denmark	Parken Stadium	DJ Havana Brown	40,000 / 40,000	—N/a
July 13	Stockholm	Sweden	Ericsson Globe	DJ Havana Brown	23,022 / 27,310	$2,690,080
July 14	Stockholm	Sweden	Ericsson Globe	DJ Havana Brown	23,022 / 27,310	$2,690,080
July 16	Helsinki	Finland	Hartwall Arena	DJ Havana Brown	—N/a	—N/a
July 19	St. Petersburg	Russia	Ice Palace	DJ Havana Brown	15,000 / 15,000	—N/a
July 21	Moscow	Russia	Olimpiyskiy	DJ Havana Brown	—N/a	—N/a
July 26	Berlin	Germany	O_{2} World	Cascada	14,880 / 14,880	$1,431,975
August 20	Hamilton	Canada	Copps Coliseum	Kristinia DeBarge; Girlicious; One Call	16,629 / 16,629	$943,852
August 21	Ottawa	Canada	Scotiabank Place	Kristinia DeBarge; Girlicious; One Call	15,883 / 15,883	$1,071,229
August 24	New York City	United States	Madison Square Garden	Jordin Sparks; Kristinia DeBarge; One Call	53,356 / 53,356	$3,814,089
August 25	New York City	United States	Madison Square Garden	Jordin Sparks; Kristinia DeBarge; One Call	53,356 / 53,356	$3,814,089
August 26	New York City	United States	Madison Square Garden	Jordin Sparks; Kristinia DeBarge; One Call	53,356 / 53,356	$3,814,089
August 29	Boston	United States	TD Garden	Jordin Sparks; Kristinia DeBarge; One Call	15,330 / 15,330	$1,036,457
August 30	Philadelphia	United States	Wachovia Center	Kristinia DeBarge; One Call	17,641 / 17,641	$1,165,725
September 1	Orlando	United States	Amway Arena	Jordin Sparks; Kristinia DeBarge	16,408 / 16,408	$687,437
September 2	Miami	United States	American Airlines Arena	Jordin Sparks; Kristinia DeBarge	14,502 / 14,502	$873,099
September 4	Atlanta	United States	Philips Arena	Jordin Sparks; Kristinia DeBarge	11,900 / 11,900	$655,507
September 5	Greensboro	United States	Greensboro Coliseum	Jordin Sparks; Kristinia DeBarge	10,813 / 10,813	$559,862
September 8	Auburn Hills	United States	The Palace of Auburn Hills	Jordin Sparks; Kristinia DeBarge	12,572 / 12,572	$935,772
September 9	Rosemont	United States	Allstate Arena	Jordin Sparks; Kristinia DeBarge	15,695 / 15,695	$722,618
September 11	Des Moines	United States	Wells Fargo Arena	Jordin Sparks; Kristinia DeBarge	10,397 / 10,397	$525,479
September 12	Grand Forks	United States	Alerus Center	Jordin Sparks; Kristinia DeBarge	12,713 / 12,713	$849,983
September 15	Tulsa	United States	BOK Center	Jordin Sparks; Kristinia DeBarge	16,930 / 16,930	$794,596
September 16	Houston	United States	Toyota Center	Jordin Sparks; Kristinia DeBarge	11,347 / 11,347	$738,656
September 18	Dallas	United States	American Airlines Center	Jordin Sparks; Kristinia DeBarge	13,471 / 13,471	$1,098,940
September 19	Bossier City	United States	CenturyTel Center	Kristinia DeBarge	10,240 / 10,240	$610,818
September 21	El Paso	United States	Don Haskins Center	Jordin Sparks; Kristinia DeBarge	11,531 / 11,531	$928,907
September 23	Los Angeles	United States	Staples Center	Jordin Sparks; Kristinia DeBarge	15,306 / 15,306	$1,162,646
September 24	San Diego	United States	San Diego Sports Arena	Jordin Sparks; Kristinia DeBarge	11,845 / 11,845	$608,300
September 26	Paradise	United States	Mandalay Bay Events Center	Jordin Sparks; Kristinia DeBarge	18,799 / 18,799	$1,712,858
September 27	Paradise	United States	Mandalay Bay Events Center	Jordin Sparks; Kristinia DeBarge	18,799 / 18,799	$1,712,858
November 6	Perth	Australia	Burswood Dome	DJ Havana Brown	34,000 / 34,000	—N/a
November 7	Perth	Australia	Burswood Dome	DJ Havana Brown	34,000 / 34,000	—N/a
November 11	Melbourne	Australia	Rod Laver Arena	DJ Havana Brown	—N/a	—N/a
November 12	Melbourne	Australia	Rod Laver Arena	DJ Havana Brown	—N/a	—N/a
November 13	Melbourne	Australia	Rod Laver Arena	DJ Havana Brown	—N/a	—N/a
November 16	Sydney	Australia	Acer Arena	DJ Havana Brown	66,247 / 69,640	$9,085,822
November 17	Sydney	Australia	Acer Arena	DJ Havana Brown	66,247 / 69,640	$9,085,822
November 19	Sydney	Australia	Acer Arena	DJ Havana Brown	66,247 / 69,640	$9,085,822
November 20	Sydney	Australia	Acer Arena	DJ Havana Brown	66,247 / 69,640	$9,085,822
November 22	Brisbane	Australia	Brisbane Entertainment Centre	DJ Havana Brown	29,457 / 39,876	$4,053,770
November 24	Brisbane	Australia	Brisbane Entertainment Centre	DJ Havana Brown	29,457 / 39,876	$4,053,770
November 25	Brisbane	Australia	Brisbane Entertainment Centre	DJ Havana Brown	29,457 / 39,876	$4,053,770
November 27	Melbourne	Australia	Rod Laver Arena	DJ Havana Brown	—N/a	—N/a
November 29	Adelaide	Australia	Adelaide Entertainment Centre	DJ Havana Brown	—N/a	—N/a
Total					1,407,986 / 1,437,003 (97%)	$120,859,409

== Cancelled shows ==
List of concerts, showing date, city, country, venue and reason for cancellation
Date	City	Country	Venue	Reason
July 24, 2009	Warsaw	Poland	Służewiec Racetrack	Contract dispute

== See also ==
- List of highest-grossing concert tours by women
