= Do Somethin' =

2005 single by Britney Spears

Single by Britney Spears

from the album Greatest Hits: My Prerogative
- Released: February 14, 2005
- Recorded: 2004
- Studio: Murlyn Studios (Stockholm, Sweden); Battery Studios (New York, NY)
- Genre: Dance-rock; electroclash
- Length: 3:23
- Label: Jive
- Songwriters: Christian Karlsson; Pontus Winnberg; Henrik Jonback; Angela Hunte
- Producer: Bloodshy & Avant

Britney Spears singles chronology
"My Prerogative" (2004)	"Do Somethin'" (2005)	"Someday (I Will Understand)" (2005)

Music video
- "Do Somethin'" on YouTube

"Do Somethin'" is a song by American singer Britney Spears from her first greatest hits album, Greatest Hits: My Prerogative (2004). It was written and produced by Christian Karlsson and Pontus Winnberg (known collectively as Bloodshy & Avant), with additional writing by Henrik Jonback and Angela Hunte. The song was never intended to be released as a single; Spears, however, wanted to shoot a music video for it, and had to convince her record company. It was then released on February 14, 2005, by Jive Records as the second single from the album outside North America. The dance-rock song features usage of electric guitars, and its lyrics allude to having a good time and not caring about other people's judgement.

"Do Somethin'" received generally favorable reviews from critics, and received comparisons to Gwen Stefani's 2004 single "What You Waiting For?". Although the single was not released in the United States, it charted on many of Billboard's component charts due to digital downloads, managing to reach number 100 on the Billboard Hot 100. It was also successful worldwide, reaching the top ten positions in 14 countries, including Australia, Denmark, and the United Kingdom. By the end of 2005, "Do Somethin'" was one of the best-selling singles in Australia and Belgium that year.

Spears pushed Jive Records to allow her to shoot an accompanying music video for the song. The music video was co-directed by Bille Woodruff and Spears (who makes her directorial debut), and is credited as her alter ego "Mona Lisa". It portrays the singer and four female friends dancing and performing in a nightclub. Spears styled the video and came up with the choreography. The usage of a Louis Vuitton dashboard in the video resulted in a lawsuit against Jive Records in late 2007, which ended with Louis Vuitton winning €80,000 in damages. The video was also banned in all European TV channels. Spears performed "Do Somethin'" during the M+M's Tour in 2007, the Circus Starring Britney Spears in 2009 and Britney: Piece of Me in 2013–17.

== Background ==
On August 13, 2004, Spears announced through Jive Records the release of her first greatest hits compilation titled Greatest Hits: My Prerogative, due November 16, 2004. The title was chosen after the album's lead single, Spears's cover version of Bobby Brown's 1988 single "My Prerogative". The cover was produced by Swedish production team Bloodshy & Avant, who produced her single "Toxic" from her fourth studio album, In the Zone (2003). A DVD of the same name was also released the same day, containing Spears's music videos. The track list was officially revealed on September 13, 2004. Greatest Hits: My Prerogative included three new tracks: "My Prerogative", "I've Just Begun (Having My Fun)" and "Do Somethin'", all of them produced by Bloodshy & Avant. The producers recorded and arranged the main instrumentation of "Do Somethin'" at Murlyn Studios, in Stockholm, Sweden. Spears recorded her vocals at Battery Studios in New York City during the Onyx Hotel Tour in 2004. Background vocals were provided by Spears, Angela Hunte, BlackCell and Emma Holmgren. The song was never planned to be released as a single. However, Spears wanted to shoot a music video for the song and had to fight with her record label to do it. She explained she was "a little disappointed" that she had to convince them "that making this video was the right thing to do at th[e] time". "Do Somethin'" was released as the second single from Greatest Hits: My Prerogative on February 14, 2005.

== Composition ==
"Do Somethin'"
A 20 second sample of "Do Somethin'", in which Spears sings the chorus.

"Do Somethin'" is a dance-rock song with usage of electric guitars and a "bump beat", as described by Spence D. of IGN. He also noted the song is "filled with faux string bursts and mock-'70s synth gurgle (think Zapp/Gap Band era) and plenty of treated guitar and bass". According to the sheetmusic published at Musicnotes.com by EMI Music Publishing, it is set at a moderately fast tempo with 130 beats per minute. The song is written in the key of E minor, and Spears' vocal range spans from the low note of E_{3} to the high note of C_{6}. Lyrically, "Do Somethin'" refers to having fun while being watched by other people, which is perceived in lines such as "Somebody pass my guitar/So I can look like a star." Tim Lee of musicOMH compared the song's style to Gwen Stefani's "What You Waiting For?" (2004).

== Critical response ==
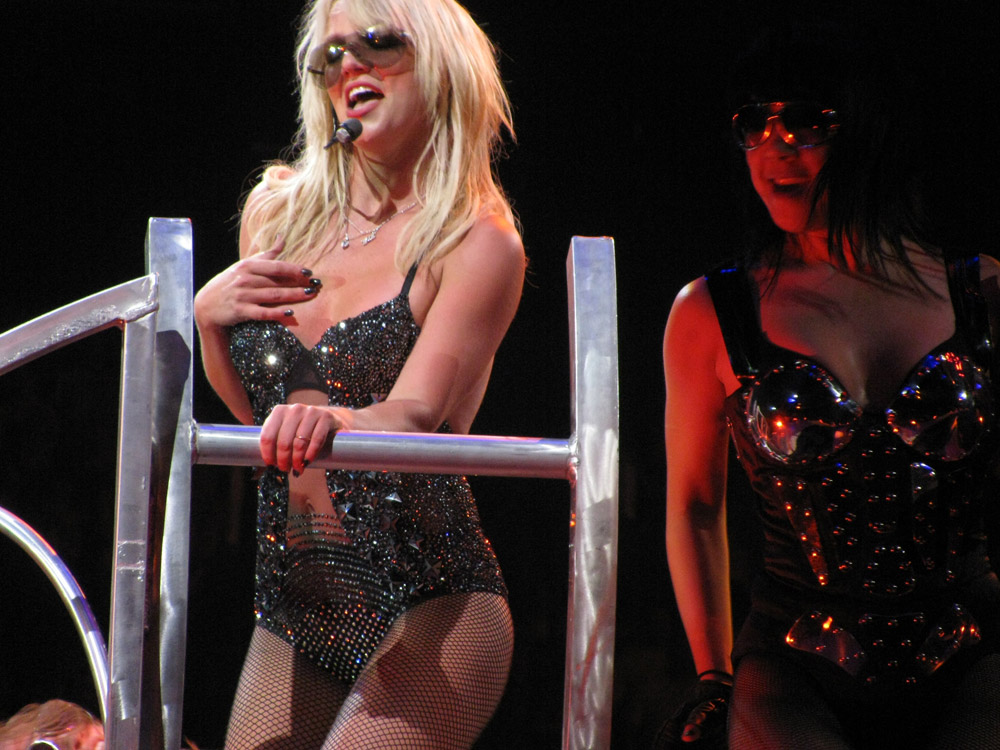
Spears performing "Do Somethin'" in her 2009 tour, the Circus Starring Britney Spears

"Do Somethin'" received positive reviews from contemporary critics. Stephen Thomas Erlewine of Allmusic said that along with "I've Just Begun (Having My Fun)", they are "two very good previously unreleased tunes". Annabel Leathes of BBC Online commented, "two robust, unreleased tracks [that] suggest, however, that she may still be churning out a few more No. 1s before taking time out to sing lullabies to her brood", while Christy Lemire of the Associated Press noted that both songs "provide Britney with further opportunities to proclaim her need to have fun and be herself, which have been running themes throughout her last two albums". Ann Powers of Blender called "Do Somethin'" "a decent bit of crunk where she raps in a cutesy-poo drawl that suggests she could have nabbed the Dukes of Hazzard sexpot role from Jessica Simpson". Spence D. of IGN considered the song "interesting for its many interpretations, no less".

Nicholas Hautman, from Us Weekly, said that "nobody does attitude like Britney, and this badass electronic jam is a prime example". Nayer Nissim, from Pink News, called it "a solid enough slab of dance pop, though it lacks that little bit of something special that distinguishes her very best singles". The staff from Entertainment Weekly placed it at number 33 on their ranking of Spears's songs; "when fans talk about whether or not Britney sounds like she's having any fun on her albums, 'Do Somethin'' should be the standard by which they measure". Shannon Barbour from Cosmopolitan called it Spears' sixth best song. Digital Spy's Alim Kheraj pointed out that "[Do Somethin']' is significant [because it] stems from the sonic direction it hints towards. Fizzing synths and harder drums pushed Britney into slightly left-field territory, something she'd continue to nurture on her next two albums

In 2025, Billboard picked it as one of the best 2005 hits of that year adding that it reverberated in everything from early Kesha to recent Lady Gaga.

== Chart performance ==
Although "Do Somethin'" was never physically released in the United States, the song peaked at number 100 on the Billboard Hot 100 due to digital downloads on April 16, 2005. The song also charted on Billboard's Pop 100 and Hot Digital Songs at number 63 and 49, respectively. As of August 2010, "Do Somethin'" has sold 363,000 paid digital downloads in the United States. In Australia, the song debuted at number eight on the week of March 7, 2005. It has since been certified gold by the Australian Recording Industry Association (ARIA) with sales of over 35,000 copies. On the same week, it debuted in the UK Singles Chart at number six. "Do Somethin'" was also successful in Europe, inside the Top 10 in Belgium (Flanders), Hungary, Sweden, Denmark and Ireland, and inside the top 20 in Belgium (Wallonia), Czech Republic, Germany, Norway, Switzerland and the Netherlands.

== Music video ==
=== Development and release ===
The music video for "Do Somethin'" was filmed in December 2004 in Los Angeles, California. It was co-directed by Spears and Bille Woodruff, who previously worked with her in "Born to Make You Happy", "Overprotected", as well as the Fantasy commercial. Spears described the shoot as "hectic", adding it was filmed "in a record-breaking five hours". She also commented about co-directing with Woodruff, saying that "he had no ego whatsoever, and the whole process was just so much fun". Spears is credited as "Mona Lisa" in the video, as she said "I kinda think she's like my alter ego whenever I feel like being mean or possibly like bustin' people around to get stuff right ... It's kinda easier to be called 'Mona Lisa' instead of Britney". The video was also choreographed and styled entirely by Spears, with clothing from Juicy Couture. Spears ultimately added that working behind the camera inspired her to become a director in the future, explaining, "After doing about 20 videos, it gets kind of boring playing the same role. I feel like being behind the camera is sometimes more satisfying than being in front of it".

=== Synopsis and reception ===
Spears dancing with her friends in the music video

In the music video, Spears wears a pink midriff T-shirt reading "Love Boat" and a pin capelet going to a club named Hole in the Wall with four blond bandmates. During the first verse, they fly in a pink Hummer and move their heads to the beat on the song, while Spears puts the truck on autopilot. The Hummer's dashboard has a Louis Vuitton pattern. They finally arrive to the club and dance in the dancefloor while being stared at by other people. Near the end of the video, Spears and her bandmates start performing on a stage. The video also includes intercut scenes of Spears in a separate room, wearing black underwear and a white mini fur coat, that was compared to the black-and-white scenes in the music video for "My Prerogative".

Jennifer Vineyard of MTV described Spears's attitude in the video as "[going] back and forth between trying to look sexy and then goofy". Since the music video was not going to be serviced in the United States, it was set to premiere in MTV UK on January 21, 2005. However, it was leaked online on January 18, 2005.

On November 18, 2007, it was reported by Forbes that LVMH's Louis Vuitton won a lawsuit on 80,000 EUR (approximately $94,000 in USD) in damages for the close-up shots of the truck's dashboard, which featured the brand's logo without authorization. The tribunal found the director of the video had clearly emphasized the logo. The tribunal ruled that responsibility for the unauthorized use lay with Sony BMG, its subsidiary Zomba Group of Companies as well as MTV Online, and not Spears herself. The music video was also banned in all European TV channels. The edited video was re-released through Vevo on July 19, 2015.

== Live performances ==
Spears performed "Do Somethin'" during the M+M's Tour in May 2007. After a performance of "Breathe on Me" from In the Zone, in which Spears and her four female dancers picked a man from the audience and danced seductively around him, the stage went dark for a few seconds. Shortly after, Spears took the stage again wearing a hot pink bra, a white fur coat and a jean skirt to perform the song. The choreography was a mimicry of the music video. The song was also performed at her 2009 tour, the Circus Starring Britney Spears. It was the second song of the fourth and last act, titled "Electro Circ". In some parts of the performance, Spears and her dancers carried giant guns that shot sparks. During the first shows of the first North American leg, she wore a gold metal bodysuit. However, on March 8, 2009, at the Tampa show, Spears suffered a wardrobe malfunction after her performance of "I'm a Slave 4 U", which caused the outfit being changed to a sparkly black bodysuit. The song was later performed in Spears' Las Vegas residency Britney: Piece of Me from 2013 to 2017. She was seen wearing a bodysuit and doing a routine with black chairs.

== Track listings ==
- CD single
1. "Do Somethin'" (album version) – 3:23
2. "Do Somethin'" (DJ Monk's remix) [radio edit] – 4:13
- CD maxi single
1. "Do Somethin'" (album version) – 3:26
2. "Do Somethin'" (DJ Monk Remix) [radio edit] – 4:17
3. "Do Somethin'" (thick vocal mix) – 8:03
4. "Everytime" (Valentin remix) – 3:25
- UK enhanced CD single
1. "Do Somethin'" (album version) – 3:27
2. "Do Somethin'" (video) – 3:22
3. "Chris Cox Megamix" (7 smash hit videos mixed together) 3:47
- Digital download (digital 45)
1. "Do Somethin'" – 3:24
2. "Do Somethin'" (thick vocal mix) – 7:57

== Credits and personnel ==
- Britney Spears – lead vocals and background vocals
- Bloodshy & Avant – songwriting, production, arrangements, all instruments, programming
- Angela Hunte – songwriting
- Steve Lunt – A&R, arrangements
- Niklas Flyckt – mixing
- Charles McCrorey – engineering
- Jonas Östman – engineering
- Henrik Jonback – guitar
- BlackCell – background vocals
- Emma Holmgren – background vocals

== Charts ==
=== Weekly charts ===
Weekly chart performance for "Do Somethin'"
Chart (2005)	Peak position
Australia (ARIA)	8
Austria (Ö3 Austria Top 40)	21
Belgium (Ultratop 50 Flanders)	12
Belgium (Ultratop 50 Wallonia)	10
CIS Airplay (TopHit)	21
Croatia (HRT)	10
Czech Republic Airplay (ČNS IFPI)	11
Denmark (Tracklisten)	4
El Salvador (Notimex)	2
European Hot 100 Singles (Billboard)	7
France (SNEP)	70
Germany (GfK)	18
Greece (IFPI)	5
Hungary (Single Top 40)	4
Ireland (IRMA)	4
Netherlands (Dutch Top 40)	6
Netherlands (Single Top 100)	13
Nicaragua (Notimex)	2
Norway (VG-lista)	12
Romania (Romanian Top 100)	9
Russia Airplay (TopHit)	17
Scottish Singles Sales (Official Charts)	7
Singapore (RIAS)	5
Sweden (Sverigetopplistan)	10
Switzerland (Schweizer Hitparade)	11
UK Singles (Official Charts)	6
US Billboard Hot 100	100

=== Year-end charts ===
Year-end chart performance for "Do Somethin'"
Chart (2005)	Position
Australia (ARIA)	67
Belgium (Ultratop 50 Flanders)	74
Belgium (Ultratop 50 Wallonia)	96
Netherlands (Dutch Top 40)	95
Romania (Romanian Top 100)	21
Sweden (Hitlistan)	65
UK Singles (OCC)	118

== Certifications ==
Certifications for "Do Somethin'"
Region	Certification	Certified units/sales
Australia (ARIA)	Gold	35,000^{^}
United States (RIAA)	Gold	500,000^{‡}
^{^} Shipments figures based on certification alone.^{‡} Sales+streaming figures based on certification alone.

== Release history ==
Release dates and formats for "Do Somethin'"
Region	Date	Format(s)	Label(s)	Ref.
Denmark	February 14, 2005	CD	Sony BMG	
Germany	February 14, 2005	Digital download (EP); maxi CD	Sony BMG	
Italy	February 14, 2005	Digital download (EP)	Sony BMG	
New Zealand	February 14, 2005	Digital download (EP)	Sony BMG	
Spain	February 14, 2005	Digital download (EP)	Sony BMG	
France	February 15, 2005	Digital download (EP); maxi CD	Sony BMG	
Australia	February 28, 2005	Maxi CD	Sony BMG	
United Kingdom	February 28, 2005	CD; digital download (EP); maxi CD	RCA	
