= Tait (company) =

Live event production company

- Formerly: Tait Towers
- Industry: Entertainment
- Founded: 1978
- Founder: Michael Tait
- Headquarters: Lititz, Pennsylvania, United States of America
- Number of locations: 19 (2024)
- Area served: Worldwide
- Key people: Adam Davis (CEO)
- Products: Industrial Automation, AVL (Audio, Video and Lighting), and IoT (Internet of Things)
- Brands: Airworks, Silent House, Gallagher Staging and Productions, Inc.
- Number of employees: 2000+ (2024)

Tait, stylized as TAIT and formerly known as Tait Towers, is a company that provides staging, scenic design, and automation for the live entertainment industry, headquartered in Lititz, Pennsylvania.

The company is a producer of stage designs for productions, including international concert tours, theatrical shows, theme parks, and permanent installations.

Tait develops show control technology, including its Navigator automation platform, used to manage stage elements. The company has expanded its scope through the acquisition of several firms, including ITEC, FTSI, Stage Technologies, Brilliant Stages, Thinkwell Group, productionglue, Kinesys, and Gallagher Staging and Productions

== History ==
Tait was founded in 1978 by Michael Tait. His experience in production and lighting design for rock tours in the 1970s led to the development of early, self-contained lighting systems known as "Tait Towers," which became the company's initial name and focus. Tait relocated the company from the UK to Lititz, Pennsylvania, in 1979

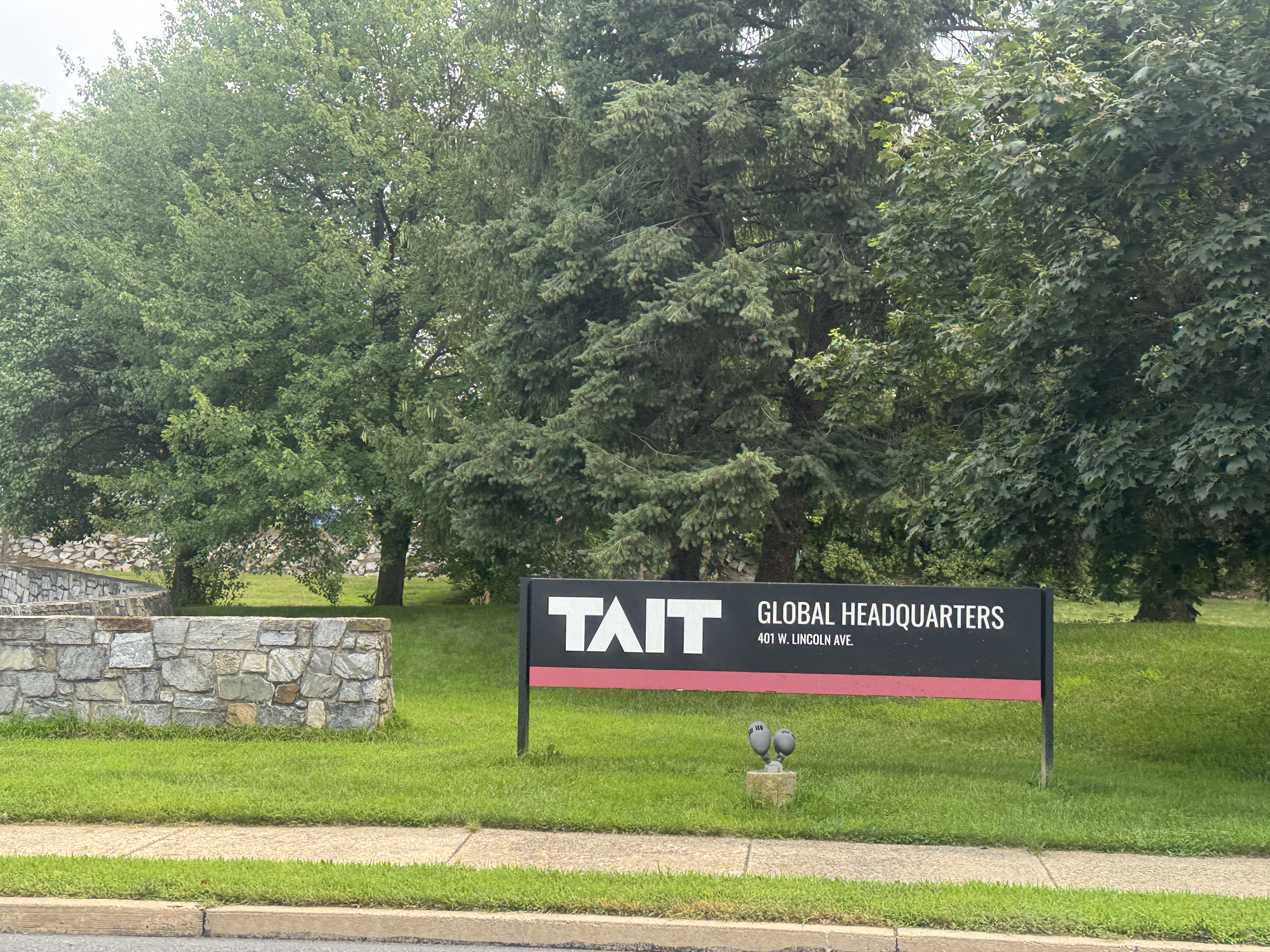
Sign of Tait headquarters in Lititz, Pennsylvania

The company grew in the 1980s, expanding into production design.

In the mid-2000s, leadership transitioned to James "Winky" Fairorth and Adam Davis, allowing Michael Tait to retire from day-to-day operations. The shift in leadership coincided with an expansion of the company globally, driven by the increasing financial importance of live touring for artists. In 2021, Adam Davis succeeded Fairorth as CEO, overseeing the company's continued growth into new sectors like themed entertainment.

In 2024, a majority stake in Tait was acquired by a private equity arm of Goldman Sachs.

== Acquisitions ==
=== Fisher Technical Services - 2012 ===
FTSI began collaborating with Tait in 2007 on Bon Jovi's Lost Highway Tour, providing winches and the control system for the production. FTSI specialized in mechanical systems, automation controls, software, and rigging.

=== Stage Technologies - 2013 ===
Stage Technologies was an automation company specializing in installations for opera houses, theaters, and automation rental services. The company played a significant role in the automation of productions across London's West End.

=== productionglue - 2016 ===
productionglue was a live event production company known for delivering brand and marketing events.

=== Kinesys - 2019 ===
Kinesys was a live event technology company specializing in automation systems for live events. Its products included winches, motion control systems for moving stage elements, drives, load cells, and hoists.

=== ITEC Entertainment - 2021 ===
ITEC Entertainment was a company specializing in the design and development of themed entertainment experiences, including resorts, rides, and shows. Its notable clients included Disney, Universal Studios, Madison Square Garden Ventures, LEGO, Wanda Group, and Dubai Parks.

=== Thinkwell Group - 2022 ===
The Thinkwell Group was an experience design and production agency founded in 2001 and headquartered in Los Angeles, California. The firm specialized in the creation of immersive environments, attractions, and events for clients worldwide. Notable projects include Warner Bros. Studio Tour London – The Making of Harry Potter in Leavesden; Ski Dubai, an indoor ski resort at the Mall of the Emirates; NatureQuest at Atlanta's Fernbank Museum of Natural History; and the grand opening event for The Wizarding World of Harry Potter at Universal Parks and Resorts and Islands of Adventure in Orlando, Florida.

=== Gallagher Stages and Productions - 2025 ===
Gallagher Staging and Productions specialized in building stages and structures for live events. Its recent projects included tours for artists such as Halsey, Chris Stapleton, and Brooks & Dunn, and the Coachella Valley Music and Arts Festival.

=== Airworks - 2025 ===
Airworks is a company that specializes in inflatable design and production for use in live events and entertainment. Notable projects that they were involved with are Lady Gaga's The Mayhem Ball Tour, Beyonce's Renaissance Tour, and The Weeknd's After Hours Til Dawn Tour.

=== Silent House - 2026 ===
Founded in 2010 by CEO Baz Halpin, Silent house is a production and creative studio that specializes in the live entertainment industry. Some recent projects by Silent House Touring include Tyler, the Creator’s CHROMAKOPIA Tour, MDLBEAST SoundStorm, and Backstreet Boys’ Into The Millennium Sphere residency. Along with this, Silent House Productions, is a part of the company that content across film, broadcasting, and streaming. Including, Taylor Swift: The Eras Tour, The Actor Awards on Netflix, and Opry100 for NBC
