= The M+M's Tour =

2007 concert tour by Britney Spears

- National tour by Britney Spears
- Location: United States
- Start date: May 1, 2007
- End date: May 20, 2007
- Legs: 1
- No. of shows: 6
- Box office: $290,226

Britney Spears concert chronology
- The Onyx Hotel Tour (2004); The M+M's Tour (2007); The Circus Starring Britney Spears (2009)

The M+M's Tour was the sixth concert tour by American entertainer Britney Spears, consisting of six brief shows at clubs in the United States. Spears expressed interest in touring again as early as February 2006. She started rehearsing for a show at House of Blues venues in secret, and pulled out of a surprise performance on April 25, 2007, at Los Angeles nightclub Forty Deuce. After a marquee reading "The M+M's" at the House of Blues in San Diego, California, appeared in late April 2007, media sources identified the act as Spears, and the show quickly sold out. The title, "M+M's" code name was claimed to be Mother (after having two children) and Miss (after being divorced). The tour marked the first time Spears performed live since The Onyx Hotel Tour in June 2004.

The show, which ran 12–16 minutes in length, featured Spears accompanied by four female back-up dancers performing choreographed dance numbers to shortened versions of five songs, including hits such as "...Baby One More Time" and "Toxic". During the performance of one song, a male audience member participated onstage. Spears' vocals during the performance were lip-synched. The shows received mixed reviews from critics and fans. Some said that Spears looked happy and in great shape, while others deemed the show as subpar. Scalpers outside the San Diego venue sold tickets with a face value of $35 for prices between $200 and $500.

== Background and development ==
"She wants people to forget she's famous for shaving her head and going into rehab. She's famous for 'Baby One More Time' and for being a dancer and being sexy and being a professional music artist. This was just a teaser, and a way for her to get some of the nerves out of the way."

— Craig Marks, editor-in-chief of Blender talking about the tour.

The shows took place against a backdrop of Spears' life struggles the previous few years that had made her fodder for tabloid reports. These included a two-day marriage, a stormy two-year marriage and divorce after having two children, shaving her head, entering rehabilitation, and various run-ins with the paparazzi.

In an interview with People in February 2006, Spears explained that she was anxious to resume her career, saying, "This may sound weird, but I miss traveling. I miss the road, seeing different places and being with the dancers and having fun. That feeling of being on the stage, knowing it's your best — I love that. I needed a break. I needed to be hungry again." On April 26, 2007, Ivan Kane, the owner of Los Angeles nightclub Forty Deuce, told E! News that Spears had pulled out of a surprise performance at the venue the previous night. Kane stated that during rehearsal, she was "looking very hot, with four backup dancers and [she] sang three songs. They ran through the set several times, the choreography was smokin', and she sounded great." Marc Malkin of E! News said that Spears thought she might need more time to prepare. He also reported that she was planning to tour House of Blues venues in the United States. Spears wanted to keep the rehearsals a secret, and did not even inform the owners of the different dance studios the reason for the preparation.

In late April 2007, a marquee reading "The M+M's" appeared at the House of Blues in San Diego. Several gossip websites and local media sources identified the act as Spears, prompting the show to quickly sell out. The title, "M+M's" code name was claimed to be Mother (after having two children) and Miss (after being divorced). On May 1, 2007, a front-page story on The San Diego Union-Tribune fueled the speculation. The same day, the doors opened at 19:00 PST (03:00 UTC), and Spears took the stage at 22:00 PST (06:00 UTC). It marked the first time Spears was on stage since her knee injury caused The Onyx Hotel Tour to be cancelled in June 2004.

== Concert synopsis ==
The concert opened with Spears taking the stage accompanied by four blonde female dancers to perform a short version of "...Baby One More Time", wearing a silver beaded bra, a pleated white skirt and white boots. She wore a long brown (blond in later dates) wig to cover the head she had shaved two and a half months previously and appeared in physically good shape. The show then segued into a flashy shortened version of "I'm a Slave 4 U". Though while Spears performed the original choreography, the performance was compared to the style of the Pussycat Dolls. The dancers then left Spears alone onstage to perform a chair routine of "Breathe on Me". They re-entered with a male fan from the audience with them and Spears giving him a lap dance. Halfway through the lap dance, Spears disappeared for a costume change leaving her dancers to continue the performance. She then reappeared in a hot pink bra, white fur coat and jean skirt to perform "Do Somethin'" with Spears throwing air guitars to the crowd. The show then concluded with "Toxic", which featured Spears and her dancers performing in a mix of Spears and Shakira dance styles. As the performance came to an end, Spears said "Thank you so much. These are my dancers" – her only words during the show – and left the stage. The show lasted around 12–16 minutes.

The first show in San Diego began two hours after the stated time. There was no live band for the shows; Spears and the dancers performed to recorded tracks. Spears' vocals during the show were also not live but rather were lip-synched to the recording. At some points, she was chewing gum while performing. The lack of live singing became most prominent during the Orlando stop of the tour, when the CD to which Spears was miming began skipping during "Do Somethin'", reportedly caused some in the audience to start booing. By the Florida shows, Spears was up to four costume changes.

== Reception ==
Teri VanHorn of MTV said that with "Her body newly toned and her smile beaming, she looked every bit like a woman who had emerged from her quarter-life crisis stronger than yesterday." She also said Spears performed with "a naughty, free-spirited attitude", as though she "had invited 900 friends to her dirty little dance party, and too bad for you if you couldn't roll with the fun." SuChin Pak, also from MTV stated the show was "no huge revelation", explaining, "It was not the kind of show that says: 'She's back. She's going to come out with the biggest album of her career.' Nor did it say that she's lost forever and we'll never see the old Britney back again. These are all really tiny baby steps." Thomas K. Arnold of USA Today said the show "turned out to be more rehearsal than comeback", although "all those post-rehab workouts were worth the effort." On May 2, 2007, scalpers outside the House of Blues in San Diego were selling tickets with a face value of $35 for prices between $200 and $500. Chris Lee of the Los Angeles Times wrote that "her 'comeback' – if you want to call it that – cemented Spears' place as pop music's reigning drama queen, capable of capturing worldwide tabloid headlines with a bare minimum of creative expenditure."

Fan reaction to the show was generally divided. Some fans attending the show were dissatisfied with its short length, with one quoted afterward as saying, "That was so disappointing." Some fans were also disappointed by the performance quality, with one quoted as saying, "It looked like she lip-synched her way through the whole thing." Other fans were more accommodating, pleased to be seeing her in good health and appearance and with one quoted as saying, "Whatever, we love her. She's amazing." One group of female fans wore matching pink tops that said "Bald Ambition" on one side and "The Comeback 2007" on the other. Jim Abbott of the Orlando Sentinel summed up some of the reaction by writing that fans at the tail end of the tour "knew that the show would be short. ... They also knew that she would be lip-synching, but this wasn't about music as much as it was about celebrity, loyalty and beating adversity."

== Setlist ==
Setlist adapted from MTV.

1. "...Baby One More Time"
2. "I'm a Slave 4 U"
3. "Breathe on Me"
4. "Do Somethin'"
5. "Toxic"

== Shows ==
List of concerts, showing date, city, country, venue, tickets sold, number of available tickets and amount of gross revenue
Date (2007)	City	Country	Venue	Attendance	Revenue
May 1	San Diego	United States	House of Blues	900 / 900	$36,896
May 2	Anaheim	United States	House of Blues	1,100 / 1,100	$38,500
May 3	Los Angeles	United States	House of Blues	1,050 / 1,050	$36,750
May 6	Las Vegas	United States	House of Blues	1,743 / 1,800	$104,580
May 19	Orlando	United States	House of Blues	2,100 / 2,100	$73,500
May 20	Miami	United States	Mansion Nightclub	—N/a	—N/a
Total				6,893 / 6,950 (99%)	$290,226
