= I'm a Slave 4 U =

2001 single by Britney Spears

Single by Britney Spears

from the album Britney
- B-side: "Intimidated"
- Released: September 24, 2001
- Recorded: July 2001
- Studio: MSR (New York City); Master Sound (Virginia Beach)
- Genre: R&B
- Length: 3:24
- Label: Jive
- Songwriters: Chad Hugo; Pharrell Williams
- Producer: The Neptunes

Britney Spears singles chronology
"Don't Let Me Be the Last to Know" (2001)	"I'm a Slave 4 U" (2001)	"Overprotected" (2001)

Music video
- "I'm a Slave 4 U" on YouTube

"I'm a Slave 4 U" is a song recorded by American singer Britney Spears for her third studio album, Britney (2001). Written and produced by Chad Hugo and Pharrell Williams of the Neptunes, it was released on September 24, 2001, by Jive Records as the lead single from the album. Marking a transition for Spears from the teen pop sounds of her previous singles, "I'm a Slave 4 U" is an R&B song. The lyrics describes the plea of a young woman to be liberated and feel independent.

Heralding a new, provocative image for Spears, "I'm a Slave 4 U" garnered a mixed reception from music critics at the time of its release. Some argued it was the singer's most mature sound at the time, compared to her previous singles, while others noticed the video and the song's attempt to leave behind Spears' girl next door image to a sexier image. The song achieved commercial success worldwide, peaking within the top ten in almost every country that it charted in. In the United States, the song peaked at number 27 on the Billboard Hot 100 and number 85 on the Hot R&B/Hip-Hop Singles & Tracks chart.

Since its release, "I'm a Slave 4 U" has become one of Spears' signature hits, as well as having been considered one of the defining songs of the early 2000s, the new millennium, and of the pop genre. The original dance choreography, from the music video and live performances, has also been widely praised and imitated, with Spears doing little to alter it for many years after the song's release. Her 2001 MTV Video Music Awards performance of the song is considered amongst the greatest live performances in pop music history, as well as a career highlight for Spears, on-par with iconic past performances of artists such as Madonna, Janet Jackson and Michael Jackson. In 2021, Billboard ranked "I'm a Slave 4 U" at number three in its list of The 100 Greatest Songs of 2001.

== Background and composition ==
"I'm a Slave 4 U"
A sample of "I'm a Slave 4 U"'s chorus, backed with breathy and moaning vocals

"I'm a Slave 4 U" is an R&B song, written and produced by Pharrell Williams and Chad Hugo of the Neptunes, who also collaborated with Britney Spears on "Boys", another track from Britney. Both recordings were originally intended for Janet Jackson's seventh studio album All for You (2001) – Jackson's recording was an unreleased demo before the track was handed to Spears. "I'm a Slave 4 U" was recorded by Andrew Cleman (Master Sound Studios, Virginia Beach, Virginia) and Brian Garten (Right Track Studios, New York City), and was mixed by Serban Ghenea. Audio engineering on the track was done by Ryan Smith and Tim Roberts. After reading the lyrics for the first time, Spears said the song reflected her desire to "go out and forget who I am", describing it as being about dancing and "having a good time". The soundscape of the song has been noted to be similar to Vanity 6's 1982 song "Nasty Girl".

== Critical reception ==
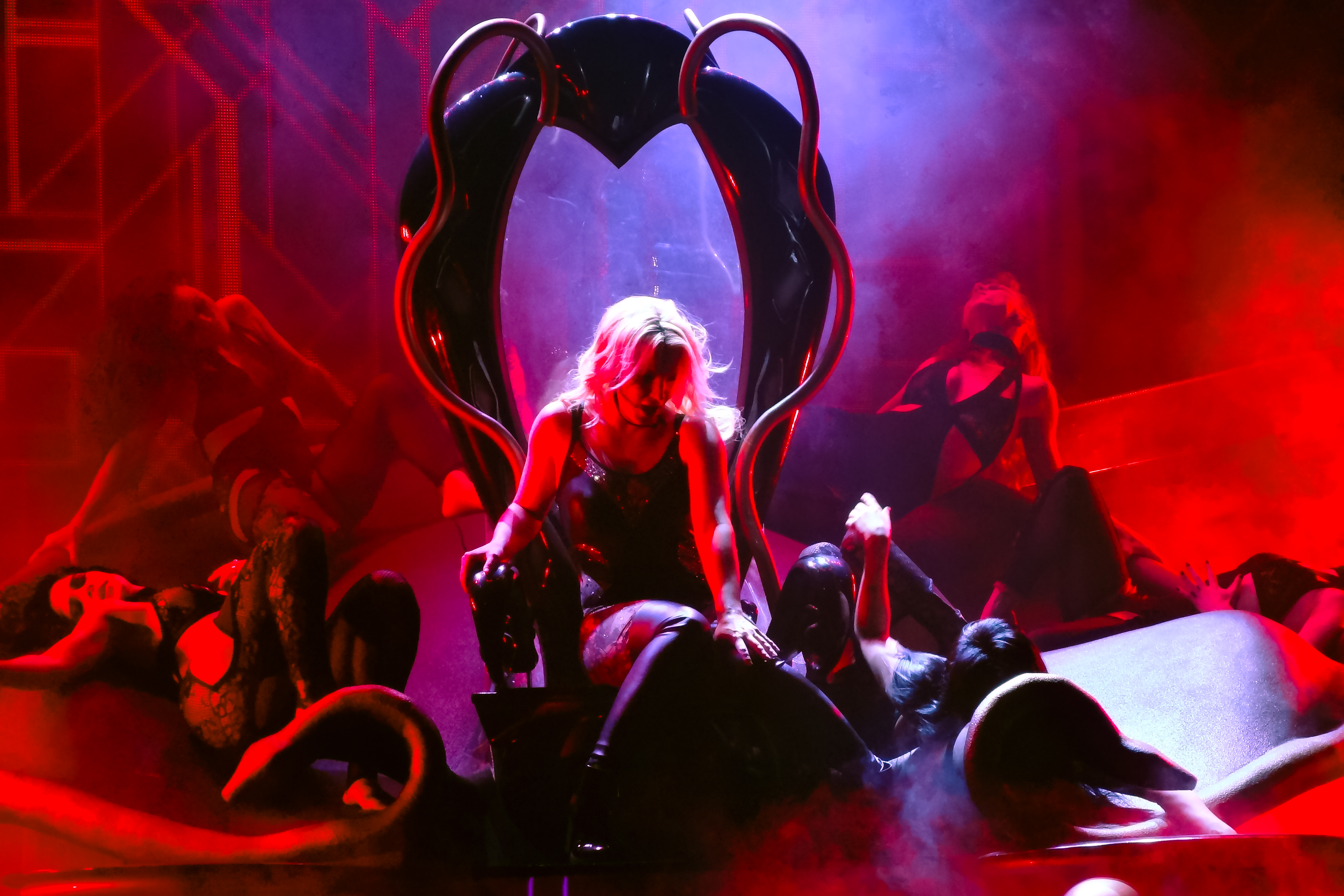
Spears performing "I'm a Slave 4 U" on the Britney: Piece of Me show in 2014

Ted Kessler from NME magazine stated that "I'm a Slave 4 U" is "funk the way God intended", characterizing it as "hypnotic, insistent, mysterious, [and] suggestive". Kessler further remarked that if Prince were a "nineteen-year-old former Disney Club host and virgin", he would be proud to have created such a release. Stephen Thomas Erlewine of AllMusic agreed that the song was a step towards a more mature sound. Rolling Stone's Barry Walters identified it as Spears's "most important" songs on the record along with "Boys", while the Neptunes-produced tracks are "not the album's most melodious". Bill Lamb from About.com listed the track at number nine on her Top 10 Songs, stating that, by the release of the single from her third album, it had become "obvious" that Spears was "becoming an adult", describing the song as a "radical shift" from the "not quite innocent" image associated with the 16-year-old schoolgirl persona of ...Baby One More Time (1999). Lamb further noted that elements described as "slinky and sexy" had begun to enter Spears' style.

"I'm a Slave 4 U" received several comparisons to American singers Janet Jackson and Prince's songs. Vertigo Shtick critic emphasized the song's production, noting that the Neptunes's "minimal" electronic approach—combined with Spears's "breathy, cooing delivery"—resulted in a track that "smacks of Prince". Yahoo! Music wrote that "I'm a Slave 4 U"—written and produced by the Neptunes and initially intended for Janet Jackson—evoked "old-school" sexual themes associated with Prince and his protégés Vanity 6, and described the song as "a real artistic leap" for Spears.

== Commercial performance ==
"I'm a Slave 4 U" peaked at number 27 on the US Billboard Hot 100 for the issue date of December 1, 2001, becoming Spears's first lead single from an album not to enter the top ten in the country. The low sales points were mostly due to the song's 12-inch single release instead of a competitive regular CD single. Despite the low sales, "I'm a Slave 4 U" became Spears' first dance hit, reaching number four on the Hot Dance Club Play chart. It is also her first and, so far, only song to appear on the Hot R&B/Hip-Hop Singles & Tracks chart, peaking at number 85. In November 2026, the Recording Industry Association of America (RIAA) certified the single double platinum, denoting two million units based on sales and streams.

In Europe, "I'm a Slave 4 U" became a top ten hit in nearly every country that it charted in, such as Germany and France, and was certified silver by the Syndicat National de l'Édition Phonographique (SNEP) for selling over 125,000 copies. The track spent two weeks at number five on the European Hot 100 Singles chart provided by magazine Music and Media at the time. In the United Kingdom, "I'm a Slave 4 U" peaked at number four on the UK Singles Chart and spent a total of 14 weeks within the top 100 and sold over 150,000 copies. In the Pacific, the track debuted at number seven on the Australian Singles Chart. Spending eight weeks on the chart, it was certified gold by the Australian Recording Industry Association (ARIA) for shipments of over 35,000 units. In New Zealand, "I'm a Slave 4 U" debuted at number 46, peaking at number 13 in its third week and spending six weeks on the chart.

In 2021, Billboard ranked "I'm a Slave 4 U" at number 3 on the 100 Greatest Songs of 2001 list, stating that it "blazed a new path for pop stars of the future" by asserting that an artist's mode of self-expression is "entirely up to them", regardless of whether audiences "like that".

== Music video ==
A still from the music video for "I'm a Slave 4 U" featuring Spears dancing in a sauna

The accompanying music video for "I'm a Slave 4 U" was filmed on a soundstage in Universal City, California, over Labor Day weekend on September 1–2, 2001, under the direction of Francis Lawrence. It made its world premiere on MTV's Making the Video on September 24 at 5 p.m. EST, the same day the song officially beat the US radio stations. Spears that the song's theme and its music video closely reflected her personal state at that point in her life. Director Lawrence explained that he wanted the video to move beyond the "sleek" dance clubs typically associated with Los Angeles or New York, instead envisioning a setting with a more international scope. He described conceiving the club as being located in an "abandoned Asian bath house", populated by "young world travelers" who seek out "far exotic places" and would naturally be drawn to a location like the one depicted in the video.

In the video, choreographed by Wade Robson, Crystal Chewning and Brian Friedman, Spears and her backup dancers employ mimicking choreography at times and sing while looking over a balcony at cars down in the distance. Spears is portrayed as a slave to the music, dancing all day until she and the backup dancers are sweaty and near dehydration, forcing them to search for water — Spears is then seen standing by a mirror at the sink. DJ Skribble appears as a cameo in the music video. Two alternative versions of the video clip can be found on the Greatest Hits: My Prerogative DVD, released on November 9, 2004.

=== Reception ===
The video clip for "I'm a Slave 4 U" was noted for drawing inspiration from Janet Jackson; Vertigo Shtick wrote that Spears's primary influence was "not Madonna but Janet Jackson", particularly in terms of her "visual element". This influence was described as evident in the video itself and as continuing through later releases such as "Me Against the Music", "Boys", and "My Prerogative", as well as her "live performances in general". In Canada, the video ranked number one in the list of the "50 Sexiest Music Videos of All-Time" published by music video channel MuchMusic in 2007. Several visual elements in the video for "Till the World Ends" draw comparisons to "I'm a Slave 4 U", with the art direction described as hewing "closely to the grimy" setting associated with the earlier video, including editing techniques which makes Spears appear as if she can "throw down on the dance floor".

The music video was nominated in three categories at the 2002 MTV Video Music Awards for Best Female Video, Best Dance Video, and Best Choreography.

== Live performances and usage in media ==
Spears performing "I'm a Slave 4 U" at the 2001 MTV Video Music Awards wearing an albino Burmese python on her shoulders

Spears first performed "I'm a Slave 4 U" at the 2001 MTV Video Music Awards at the Metropolitan Opera House in New York City on September 6, 2001. The performance is widely considered amongst the greatest moments in the award show's history as well as in pop culture. The performance featured a white tiger (wrangled by Bhagavan Antle) and a live amelanistic Burmese python on her shoulders. Other performances include several television appearances to promote her third album, Britney. She performed on The Tonight Show with Jay Leno on October 11, and a special named Total Britney Live was aired by MTV on November 3, where Spears performed "I'm a Slave 4 U", "Stronger", and "I'm Not a Girl, Not Yet a Woman". Two days later, on November 5, Spears performed "I'm a Slave 4 U" on The Rosie O'Donnell Show, and on the Late Show with David Letterman the day after. A month later, she opened the 2001 Billboard Music Awards in Las Vegas on December 4, 2001, with a performance of the track on a stage inside the fountains of the Bellagio Hotel.

Spears performed the song on the 2001–02 Dream Within a Dream Tour, in a setting resembling the performance at the MTV Video Music Awards. According to Jim Farber from New York Daily News, "But for all the bumping and grinding that went on, parents had no reason to cover their daughters' eyes". To promote her fourth studio album In the Zone, she performed the track at the 2003 NFL Kickoff Live on September 4, 2003, at the National Mall. Other songs performed included "Me Against the Music" and "...Baby One More Time". On September 14, Spears played a surprise concert at Rain Nightclub in the Palms Casino Resort, and performed the aforementioned songs along with a new song titled "Breathe on Me". On November 17, a concert special titled Britney Spears: In the Zone aired on ABC, and included a mash-up of "I'm a Slave 4 U" and "Boys". On The Onyx Hotel Tour in 2004, the track was included on the setlist and had a "Flintstones-meets-Survivor" set.

"I'm a Slave 4 U" was performed as a shortened version on the 2007 The M+M's Tour. On The Circus Starring Britney Spears in 2009, Spears performed the song in a setting "complete with flames and a fierce dance routine", which managed to "rise above all the ephemera" according to MTV News' James Montgomery. For the Femme Fatale Tour in 2011, "I'm a Slave 4 U" was performed as fetishistic shots of naked, bound men were displayed on the backdrops. On her residency concert in Las Vegas, Britney: Piece of Me (2013–17), Spears initially started the performance sat on a throne surrounded by her female dancers who are playing in a fountain. Later on, the throne was removed in favor of a pole. At the 2016 Billboard Music Awards, the song was once again on a stripper pole as part of a greatest hits medley. While promoting her ninth studio album Glory in 2016, Spears performed the song at several music festivals worldwide, including the iHeartRadio Music Festival, Apple Music Festival, KIIS-FM Jingle Ball, and the 99.7's Triple Ho Show. "I'm a Slave 4 U" was performed on the 2017 Britney: Live in Concert Asian tour, as well as on the Piece of Me Tour in 2018, which covered North America and Europe.

According to rehearsal videos published at Spears's social media accounts in late 2018, "I'm a Slave 4 U" was set to be performed at her planned residency Britney: Domination prior to its cancellation.

== Influence and legacy ==
"I'm a Slave 4 U" was widely seen as being a departure from Spears' girl next door image and signature bubblegum pop sound from her previous two albums – ...Baby One More Time and Oops!... I Did It Again – the sound of the single leans more towards "urban pop" and R&B, and the accompanying video and live performances are more overtly sexual. Upon its release, the song and video - as well as Spears' performance at the 2001 MTV Video Music Awards - were heavily criticized for their overt sexual nature as well as for Spears only being 19 years old at the time. Many critics at the time compared the song and its video to that of Prince and Janet Jackson. Some critics also noted similarities in Spears' slight transition from bubblegum pop and more confident overt sexuality to that of Madonna in the early 1990s, during which she was transitioning from her pop sound of the 1980s to a more mature sound and more explicit sexuality on her single and music video for "Justify My Love" and on her Erotica album.

Miley Cyrus has also cited "I'm a Slave 4 U" for influencing the song and video for her 2013 hit "We Can't Stop". Likewise, Selena Gomez cited the song for influencing her 2013 single "Come & Get it". In a 2010 interview with Vanity Fair, Lindsay Lohan said the song and video for "I'm a Slave 4 U" were the main influence for her 2004 hit "Rumors", with Lohan even using the same director Spears had previously used on her video "My Prerogative". At the 2014 MTV Video Music Awards, Nicki Minaj had planned on paying homage to Spears' 2001 performance for her performance of her song "Anaconda" by using several albino snakes, however, MTV banned Minaj's use of live snakes after a backup dancer was bitten. In 2016, Mexican-American singer Becky G paid homage to Spears' 2001 VMA performance by dancing with a yellow snake to her song "Sola" at Univision's annual awards show 2016 Premios Juventud. In 2020, Jazmin Bean recorded a cover of the song for the expanded reissue of their debut extended play Worldwide Torture (2019).

=== Controversy ===
"I'm a Slave 4 U" was seen as so controversial upon its release that Spears received immense backlash from The Parents Association of America (PAA), as well as several other conservative outlets. The PAA also urged people to boycott Spears and criticized her for "being an irresponsible and bad role model to young girls all over the country", with even Kendel Ehrlich, the wife of Maryland governor Bob Ehrlich proclaiming at a live press conference, "If I had a chance, I would shoot Britney Spears." Spears responded to the backlash in a December 2001 Rolling Stone article, "I don't see the big deal and I don't see the need for an apology. I'm a 19-year-old girl about to be 20, I'm growing up and there's nothing wrong with that. Besides no matter what, I can never win, when I did '...Baby One More Time' they were saying I was too controversial, so you can never win."

One of her historic power moves: belly dancing with a python at the 2001 MTV Video Music Awards to the blingiest Neptunes beat. "I'm a Slave 4 U" is the ultimate Britney song of dancing as liberation versus dancing as addiction. "All you people look at me like I'm a little girl", she sings, perhaps slightly misjudging her relationship with the American public. But she lets out her kitty-kitty yowls with a bad case of cat-scratch fever. And the Prince-style spelling makes sense, since the sugar-walls strut of "I'm a Slave 4 U" splits the difference musically between Vanity 6's "Nasty Girl" and Apollonia 6's "Sex Shooter".

— Rob Sheffield from Rolling Stone on the legacy of "I'm a Slave 4 U".

While then seen as controversial, in subsequent years "I'm a Slave 4 U" has since gone down in pop culture history with Billboard regarding the video and song itself as "groundbreaking, daring and artistically creative" in 2013. Many music critics have credited the Britney album as a whole and its lead single "I'm a Slave 4 U" for inspiring other female artists of her own generation and the generation following her. In 2017, writing for Rolling Stone, Peter Travers noted, "In the early 2000s there was no one bigger in music than Britney Spears and with her third studio album Britney and its lead single 'I'm a Slave 4 U', Britney Spears started a new trend: that of a young girl transitioning from the Disney Channel to a squeaky-clean pop image than into overtly sexual 'femme fatale'. From girls of her own era, such as Christina Aguilera and Jessica Simpson, to girls of the next generation, such as Miley Cyrus and Selena Gomez, Spears blazed the trail of how to grow and sustain from Disney kid to pop sensation to pop culture powerhouse."

== Track listings ==
- European CD single
1. "I'm a Slave 4 U" (main version) – 3:23
2. "Intimidated" – 3:17
- European and Australian CD maxi single
1. "I'm a Slave 4 U" (main version) – 3:23
2. "I'm a Slave 4 U" (instrumental) – 3:23
3. "Intimidated" – 3:17
4. "Britney... Interview" – 4:16
- Japanese CD maxi single
1. "I'm a Slave 4 U" (main version) – 3:23
2. "I'm a Slave 4 U" (instrumental) – 3:23
3. "Intimidated" – 3:17
- UK CD maxi and cassette single
1. "I'm a Slave 4 U" (main version) – 3:23
2. "Intimidated" – 3:17
3. "I'm a Slave 4 U" (instrumental) – 3:23
- 12-inch vinyl
1. "I'm a Slave 4 U" (main version) – 3:23
2. "I'm a Slave 4 U" (instrumental) – 3:23
- 12-inch vinyl (The Remixes)
1. "I'm a Slave 4 U" (Thunderpuss club mix) – 8:45
2. "I'm a Slave 4 U" (Thunderpuss radio mix) – 3:18
3. "I'm a Slave 4 U" (Miguel Migs Petalpusher vocal) – 5:30
4. "I'm a Slave 4 U" (The Light remix) – 8:25
- 2026 digital single
1. "I'm a Slave 4 U" – 3:25
2. "I'm a Slave 4 U (Thunderpuss Club Mix)" – 8:48
3. "I'm a Slave 4 U (Thunderpuss Radio Mix)" – 3:20
4. "I'm a Slave 4 U (Thunderpuss Mixshow Edit (The Remix))" – 6:18
5. "I'm a Slave 4 U (Thunderpuss Tribapella)" – 5:18
6. "I'm a Slave 4 U (Thunderpuss Dark Mix)" – 7:16
7. "I'm a Slave 4 U (Thunderpuss Dark Dub)" – 7:16
8. "I'm a Slave 4 U (Miguel Migs Petalpusher Vocal)" – 5:32
9. "I'm a Slave 4 U (Miguel Migs Petalpusher Vocal Edit)" – 3:34
10. "I'm a Slave 4 U (Miguel Migs Petalpusher Dub)" – 5:47
11. "I'm a Slave 4 U (The Light Remix)" – 8:26
12. "I'm a Slave 4 U (Instrumental)" – 3:24
13. "I'm a Slave 4 U (A cappella)" – 3:23

== Charts ==
=== Weekly charts ===
Chart (2001–2002)	Peak position
Australia (ARIA)	7
Austria (Ö3 Austria Top 40)	6
Belgium (Ultratop 50 Flanders)	6
Belgium (Ultratop 50 Wallonia)	4
Canada (Nielsen SoundScan)	8
Canada CHR (Nielsen BDS)	11
Croatia (HRT)	7
Denmark (Tracklisten)	8
Eurochart Hot 100 (Music & Media)	5
European Radio Top 50 (Music & Media)	12
Finland (Suomen virallinen lista)	4
France (SNEP)	8
Germany (GfK)	3
Greece (IFPI)	6
Ireland (IRMA)	6
Italy (FIMI)	4
Italy Airplay (Music & Media)	12
Japan (Oricon)	33
Netherlands (Dutch Top 40)	6
Netherlands (Single Top 100)	9
New Zealand (Recorded Music NZ)	13
Norway (VG-lista)	3
Portugal (AFP)	2
Romania (Romanian Top 100)	10
Russia Airplay (Music & Media)	15
Scottish Singles Sales (Official Charts)	4
Spain (Promusicae)	6
Sweden (Sverigetopplistan)	7
Switzerland (Schweizer Hitparade)	7
UK Singles (Official Charts)	4
UK Independent (Official Charts)	1
US Billboard Hot 100	27
US Dance Club Songs (Billboard) Remixes	4
US Dance Singles Sales (Billboard) Remixes	8
US Hot R&B/Hip-Hop Songs (Billboard)	85
US Pop Airplay (Billboard)	15
US Rhythmic Airplay (Billboard)	21
US CHR/Pop (Radio & Records)	18
US CHR/Rhythmic (Radio & Records)	31

Chart (2012)	Peak position
Hungary (Single Top 40)	5

=== Year-end charts ===
Chart (2001)	Position
Australia (ARIA)	99
Belgium (Ultratop 50 Flanders)	52
Belgium (Ultratop 50 Wallonia)	50
Brazil (Crowley Broadcast Analysis)	24
Canada (Nielsen SoundScan)	124
Eurochart Hot 100 (Music & Media)	59
France (SNEP)	64
Ireland (IRMA)	70
Netherlands (Dutch Top 40)	81
Netherlands (Single Top 100)	78
Romania (Romanian Top 100)	93
Sweden (Hitlistan)	58
Switzerland (Schweizer Hitparade)	68
Taiwan (Hito Radio)	54
UK Singles (OCC)	83

== Certifications and sales ==
Region	Certification	Certified units/sales
Australia (ARIA)	Gold	35,000^{^}
Belgium (BRMA)	Gold	25,000^{*}
France (SNEP)	Silver	198,301
New Zealand (RMNZ)	Gold	15,000^{‡}
Norway (IFPI Norway)	Gold	5,000^{*}
Sweden (GLF)	Gold	15,000^{^}
United Kingdom (BPI)	Gold	400,000^{‡}
United States (RIAA)	2× Platinum	2,000,000^{‡}
^{*} Sales figures based on certification alone.^{^} Shipments figures based on certification alone.^{‡} Sales+streaming figures based on certification alone.

== Release history ==
Region	Date	Format(s)	Label(s)	Ref.
United States	September 24–25, 2001	Contemporary hit radio; rhythmic contemporary radio	Jive	
Australia	October 15, 2001	Maxi CD	Zomba	
Germany	October 15, 2001	Maxi CD	Rough Trade	
United Kingdom	October 15, 2001	Cassette; maxi CD	Jive	
Japan	October 17, 2001	Maxi CD	Zomba	
New Zealand	October 22, 2001	Maxi CD	Zomba	
France	October 23, 2001	CD; maxi CD	Jive	
United States	October 30, 2001	12-inch vinyl	Jive	
Various	September 24, 2026	Digital download; streaming	RCA/Jive	
