= Greatest Hits: My Prerogative =

- Standard cover (Note: Physical limited edition cover features a gleaming, reflective silver background. Original digital cover features a light brown background and the title in a different typeface.)

Greatest hits album by Britney Spears
- Released: November 3, 2004
- Recorded: May 1998–May 2004
- Studios: Battery (New York); Château de Sully (La Tour-de-Peilz); Cheiron (Stockholm); Conway (Los Angeles); Hit Factory Criteria (Miami); Maratone (Stockholm); Master Sound (Virginia Beach); Murlyn (Stockholm); Olympic (London); Record Plant (Los Angeles); Triangle Sound (Atlanta); Right Track (New York); Teldex (Berlin)
- Genres: Pop; dance-pop
- Length: 60:14
- Label: Jive
- Producers: Bloodshy & Avant; Jörgen Elofsson; Rodney Jerkins; R. Kelly; David Kreuger; Robert John "Mutt" Lange; Kristian Lundin; Penelope Magnet; Per Magnusson; Max Martin; The Neptunes; Rami; Guy Sigsworth; Trixster

Britney Spears chronology
In the Zone (2003)	Greatest Hits: My Prerogative (2004)	Britney & Kevin: Chaotic (2005)

Singles from Greatest Hits: My Prerogative
- 1. "My Prerogative" Released: September 20, 2004; 2. "Do Somethin'" Released: February 14, 2005

Greatest Hits: My Prerogative is the first greatest hits album by American singer Britney Spears. It was released on November 3, 2004, by Jive Records. Alongside singles from Spears' studio albums ...Baby One More Time (1999), Oops!... I Did It Again (2000), Britney (2001), and In the Zone (2003), the compilation included three new tracks—a cover of Bobby Brown's "My Prerogative", "Do Somethin'", and "I've Just Begun (Having My Fun)". It was released in standard and limited editions, with the latter containing a bonus disc with remixes, as well as a DVD form featuring 20 of Spears' music videos.

Greatest Hits: My Prerogative received mixed to favorable reviews from music critics, some of whom felt that it was an accurate portrayal of Spears as the defining figure of American pop culture, while others stated that she did not have enough material for a greatest hits album and also deemed it premature. A commercial success, it debuted at number four on the US Billboard 200, with first-week sales of 255,000 copies, but became Spears' first album not to reach the summit. It was certified platinum by the Recording Industry Association of America (RIAA) and has sold over five million copies worldwide.

Greatest Hits: My Prerogative received little promotion as Spears injured her knee in June 2004 and was left unable to perform, but produced two singles. The titular track was released as the lead single and peaked within the top 10 in most international countries, but failed to enter the US Billboard Hot 100, instead peaking atop the US Bubbling Under Hot 100. "Do Somethin'" was released as the second and final single from the album, and peaked at number 100 on the US Billboard Hot 100 despite not being released in the US, while reaching the top ten in numerous countries.

== Background ==
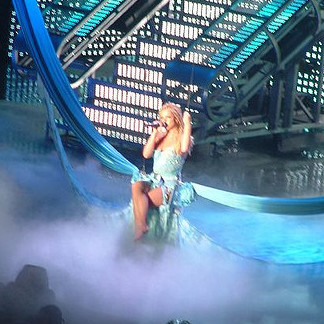
Spears performing during the Onyx Hotel Tour (2004); she recorded "My Prerogative" and "Do Somethin'" while on the tour.

In 1997, 15-year-old Britney Spears signed a record deal with Jive Records after plans for her to join the girl group Innosense fell through. Her debut single "...Baby One More Time" was released in September 1998, peaking atop the US Billboard Hot 100 and almost everywhere it charted. Her debut studio album of the same title was released in January 1999, and made Spears the first artist in history to have their debut single and debut album simultaneously atop the Billboard Hot 100 and Billboard 200, respectively. It was followed by Oops!... I Did It Again in May 2000, which debuted atop the US Billboard 200 and registered the highest first-week sales for a female artist at the time, selling 1,319,000 copies in its first week. Both albums were eventually certified diamond by the Recording Industry Association of America (RIAA) and became two of the best-selling albums of all time. Spears' subsequent studio albums Britney (2001) and In the Zone (2003) both debuted atop the US Billboard 200, albeit selling slower than their predecessors. Regardless, both received multi-platinum certifications from the RIAA, and made Spears the second female artist after Janet Jackson to have four consecutive US number-one albums. The latter produced "Toxic", Spears' most commercially successful single since "Oops!... I Did It Again" (2000); it won Spears her first Grammy Award, for Best Dance Recording in 2005.

The Onyx Hotel Tour, on which Spears embarked in support of In the Zone, was abruptly cancelled in June 2004, following Spears' knee injury while filming the accompanying music video for "Outrageous", the final single from In the Zone. During the tour, Spears had recorded two new songs, which would appear on Greatest Hits: My Prerogative, and began a relationship with American dancer Kevin Federline. The couple became engaged in July and got married on September 18. (Note: While Spears and Federline held a wedding ceremony on September 18, 2004, they were not legally married until three weeks later, on October 6, due to a delay in finalizing the couple's prenuptial agreement.) Within that period, Spears embarked on a prolonged hiatus from performing, both due to the injury and to start a family; she wouldn't release another studio album until Blackout (2007). Retrospectively, Stephen Thomas Erlewine from AllMusic noted that Spears "hadn't been out of the pop culture headlines since she released her debut album, ...Baby One More Time, in January 1999. In the nearly six years separating that debut album and the release of Greatest Hits in November 2004, Britney was omnipresent, representing both the entire teen pop phenomenon of the turn of the millennium, plus the teasing, Maxim-fueled sexuality of the time".

== New material ==
"My Prerogative"
A 21-second sample of "My Prerogative", in which Spears sings over a background of synthesizers.

Greatest Hits: My Prerogative included three previously unreleased tracks—"My Prerogative", "I've Just Begun (Having My Fun)" and "Do Somethin'"—all of which were produced by Bloodshy & Avant. "My Prerogative" is a cover of Bobby Brown's 1988 song of the same title, with the original version's lyrics altered to fit a woman's perspective: "They say I'm nasty, but I don't give a damn / Getting boys is how I live / Some ask me questions, why am I so real? / But they don't understand me, or really don't know the deal / About a sista trying hard to make it right." Spears recorded the cover during the European leg of the Onyx Hotel Tour in May 2004, at the Murlyn Studios in Stockholm, Sweden, and the Teldex Studio in Berlin, Germany. The cover is musically different from the bass-infused new jack swing original, showcasing a more contemporary synthpop sound, driven by synthesizers and elements typical of Bloodshy & Avant productions. Jennifer Vineyard of MTV commented the cover could be interpreted as a statement on Spears' life and the media reactions to some of her decisions at the time, including her engagement to Kevin Federline.

"I've Just Begun (Having My Fun)" was originally recorded for Spears' fourth studio album In the Zone (2003), but was left unused until the release of the video album of the same title in April 2004; the DVD+CD set included an extended play (EP), whose international editions included the song. In the US, it was made available as a free digital download on the Walmart-exclusive edition of In the Zone, due to an exclusive deal with Walmart and Sony Connect. A dance and electro track, "I've Just Begun (Having My Fun)" was noted for its resemblance to No Doubt's 2001 song "Hella Good". Lyrically, it describes a "make-believe encounter with a boy at a party that made her feel a little wild but leaves her falling asleep in a chair". Like "My Prerogative", Spears recorded "Do Somethin'" during the Onyx Hotel Tour, at the Battery Studios in New York City and the Murlyn Studios in Stockholm. "Do Somethin'" is an electric guitar-driven dance-rock track, "filled with faux string bursts and mock-'70s synth gurgle (think Zapp/Gap Band era) and plenty of treated guitar and bass". Lyrically, the track refers to having fun while being watched by other people, encouraging them to "do something".

== Marketing ==
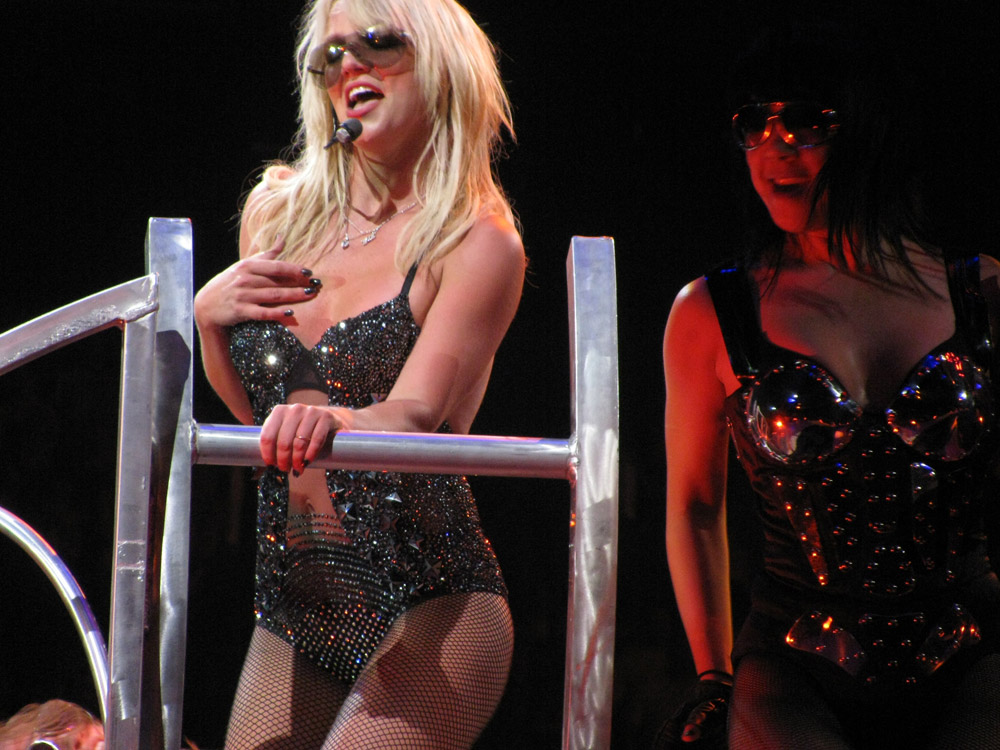
Spears performing "Do Somethin'" during the Circus Starring Britney Spears in 2009

On August 13, 2004, Spears announced through Jive Records the release of her first greatest hits album, titled Greatest Hits: My Prerogative, for November 16. "I've Just Begun (Having My Fun)" was released as a promotional single via iTunes Store on August 17, following the end of the deal between Jive, Walmart and Sony Connect. The track listing for the album was officially revealed on September 13, including "I've Just Begun (Having My Fun)" alongside two previously unreleased tracks. The album's release would later be advanced to November 9 in the US, being released internationally starting in Sweden on November 3. A limited edition was also released, including a bonus disc with remixes of Spears' songs by different producers, as well as a Chris Cox-produced megamix of Spears' hits. Greatest Hits: My Prerogative was simultaneously released on DVD, featuring all of Spears' music videos, including "Outrageous", which had been left unfinished. In addition, alternative versions for 10 of the 20 videos are included on a separate menu, displaying previously unreleased footage.

"My Prerogative" was released as the lead single from Greatest Hits: My Prerogative on September 20, 2004. It went on to achieve international commercial success, topping the charts in Finland, Ireland, Italy and Norway, and reaching the top 10 in numerous other countries. In the US, it peaked atop the Bubbling Under Hot 100 Singles and failed to enter the Billboard Hot 100, hence becoming Spears' first lead single not to enter the chart. The song's Jake Nava-directed accompanying music video was described by Spears' mother Lynne as being "about capturing gorgeous close-ups and very subtle movement" since Spears could not do any choreography due to her knee injury, and as having "an element of old Hollywood glamour and mystery". Although no more singles were planned, Spears wanted to film an accompanying music video for "Do Somethin'" and pushed for its release. The song was released as the second and final single from Greatest Hits: My Prerogative outside North America on February 14, 2005. Like its predecessor, it reached the top 10 in numerous countries, including Australia and the UK. Though not released as a single in the US, it reached number 100 on the Billboard Hot 100 due to digital sales. The accompanying music video was directed by Spears herself, who was credited as her alter ego Mona Lisa, and Bille Woodruff. It follows the song's lyrical theme, with Spears and her entourage dancing at a nightclub whilst being stared at by other attendees.

Due to her knee injury and the consequent cancellation of the Onyx Hotel Tour, Spears embarked on a prolonged hiatus from performing. She thus made no televised appearances upon the release of Greatest Hits: My Prerogative, much unlike her heavily promoted previous albums. Spears would not perform live again until the M+M's Tour in May 2007, during which she performed "Do Somethin'" live for the first time, wearing a hot pink bra, a white fur coat and a jean skirt and mimicking the music video's choreography. (Note: Spears would subsequently perform "Do Somethin'" during her concert tours The Circus Starring Britney Spears (2009), Britney: Live in Concert (2017) and the Piece of Me Tour (2018), as well as during her Las Vegas concert residency Britney: Piece of Me (2013–2017).) Following the cancellation of Spears' concert residency Britney: Domination, which was planned for 2019, its creative directors Tabitha and Napoleon D'umo revealed that Spears would have performed "My Prerogative" live for the first time during the residency.

== Critical reception ==
Professional ratings
Review scores
Source	Rating
AllMusic	3/5 stars
Blender	3/5 stars
Christgau's Consumer Guide	(2-star Honorable Mention)
The Encyclopedia of Popular Music	3/5 stars
The Guardian	3/5 stars
IGN	6.9/10
New Straits Times	3/5 stars
NME	6/10
Tom Hull	B+
Uncut	4/5 stars

Greatest Hits: My Prerogative received mixed to positive reviews from music critics. Mary Awosika of the Sarasota Herald-Tribune selected "I've Just Begun (Having My Fun)" as the best of the new tracks, and added that "The rest of the album is a romp down memory lane of when Spears was the 'It' girl of popular culture, ruling the pop charts as a multi-million dollar entertainment should. [...] In all honesty, no one can deny Spears has recorded some great dance songs, and this album is the best way to get all the songs in one swoop". Faridul Anwar Farinordin of the New Straits Times said "rest assured, fans will surely grab this one" and selected "Oops!... I Did It Again" and "Overprotected" as the best tracks. Annabel Leathes of BBC Online deemed it "calorific as the KFC burgers dished up at her chav-style wedding; twenty finger lickin' tracks that mirror her trajectory from pretty pop puff to lusty strumpet". Christy Lemire of the Associated Press stated that it was premature for Spears to release a greatest hits album after only five years, but highlighted "I'm a Slave 4 U", "Toxic" and "Everytime". Andy Petch-Jex of MusicOMH highlighted the first four tracks and commented "true some of the tunes are complete pony plops, but beneath the occasional reek there beats a solid gold pop heart". Kitty Empire from The Guardian described the album as "an aural history of the past five years. It leaves you knowing nothing about the woman herself, but plenty about the absurd and joyous strut and fret of contemporary sound confectionery." While reviewing the Greatest Hits: My Prerogative DVD for the same publication, James Griffiths praised Spears as "the ultimate video performer" and described her videography as "MTV video age in human form".

Spence D. of IGN said: "If Britney Spears' Greatest Hits: My Prerogative illuminates anything it's that Spears is a fairly proficient sonic chameleon, able to mimic and adopt the stylings of those who have come before her with enough panache and verve to convince younger generations that she's a bona fide pop revelation. [...] This is the kind of kitschy album that you can get away with having because Spears is such a prevalent component of pop culture." James Gashinski of The Western Gazette said: "As a time capsule, My Prerogative does its job well", but "Added together, the pop hits on this album are somewhat less than the sum of their parts". He further explained: "Even if it isn't as great a listen as a cohesive album, My Prerogative does work as a portrait of the time when Britney Spears was the defining figure of American pop culture". Stephen Thomas Erlewine of AllMusic agreed with Gashinski, but added "if you compare it to The Immaculate Collection, which captured the time when Madonna was the defining figure of American pop culture and does work as an album, it's clear that a cultural artifact isn't necessarily the same thing as great music". Ann Powers of Blender said: "The hits collected on My Prerogative are as sticky as soda and almost as easy to rinse out. Spears will go down in history books, but not for anything she's created, besides a world-class stir". She named "...Baby One More Time" "the song that defined her legacy" and also added: "In less than five minutes, it contains an emotional storm that is both widely public and deeply personal. If only she had continued to prove worthy of that heroic task." Kelefa Sanneh of The New York Times said: "Listening to her hits all at once, you may be struck by the seductive severity of Ms. Spears's music: the beats are sharp as tines, the lyrics are filled with evocations of fear and control, the voice projects nothing you might mistake for warmth".

== Commercial performance ==
In the US, Greatest Hits: My Prerogative debuted at number four on the Billboard 200 chart dated November 27, 2004, with first-week sales exceeding 255,000 copies, becoming her first album not to debut at the summit. In its second week, it descended to number 12, and went on to spend a total of 35 weeks on the chart. In December, the album was certified platinum by the Recording Industry Association of America (RIAA) for shipments of one million copies. Its video counterpart simultaneously debuted and peaked at number three on the US Music Video Sales, and was certified double platinum by the RIAA for shipping 200,000 units. On the Billboard 200 year-end chart for 2005, Greatest Hits: My Prerogative placed at number 74. As of January 2019, it has sold over 1,800,000 copies in the US. In Canada, the album debuted at number three on the Canadian Albums Chart, with first-week sales of 20,400 copies.

In the United Kingdom, Greatest Hits: My Prerogative debuted at number two on the UK Albums Chart, behind Eminem's Encore, with first-week sales of 115,341 units. It was certified triple platinum by the British Phonographic Industry (BPI) on July 22, 2013, and has sold over one million copies in the UK as of 2016. The album debuted atop the charts in Ireland, Singapore and Scotland. Across mainland Europe, it debuted at number three on the European Top 100 Albums, and within the top ten in Austria, Belgium, the Czech Republic, Denmark, Finland, Germany, Hungary, Italy, the Netherlands, Norway, Portugal, Spain and Switzerland, also peaking at number one in Greece. In November 2004, the album was certified platinum by the International Federation of the Phonographic Industry (IFPI) for sales of one million copies across Europe.

In Australia, Greatest Hits: My Prerogative debuted and peaked at number four on the ARIA Top 100 Albums, spending its first three weeks within the top ten, and atop the ARIA Top 40 DVD chart. It was certified double platinum by the Australian Recording Industry Association (ARIA) on January 23, 2005, indicating shipments of 140,000 units. In New Zealand, the album debuted and peaked at number 17, later being certified gold by the Recorded Music NZ (RMNZ). In Japan, Greatest Hits: My Prerogative became Spears' first number-one album on the Oricon Albums Chart, selling 173,145 copies in its first week. It was certified triple platinum by the Recording Industry Association of Japan (RIAJ) in March 2005, for shipments of over 750,000 copies, and remains her best-selling album in the country with sales of over one million copies, as of 2009. Its video counterpart reached number two on the Oricon DVD Chart. At the 19th Japan Gold Disc Awards (2005), the releases were among the recipients for International Rock & Pop Albums of the Year and International Music Videos of the Year. As of 2019, Greatest Hits: My Prerogative has sold over five million copies worldwide.

== Track listing ==
=== Disc one ===
Standard edition
No.	Title	Writer(s)	Producer(s)	Length
1.	"My Prerogative"	Bobby Brown; Gene Griffin; Edward Teddy Riley	Bloodshy & Avant	3:33
2.	"Toxic" (from In the Zone, 2003)	Cathy Dennis; Christian Karlsson; Pontus Winnberg; Henrik Jonback	Bloodshy & Avant	3:19
3.	"I'm a Slave 4 U" (from Britney, 2001)	Chad Hugo; Pharrell Williams	The Neptunes	3:25
4.	"Oops!... I Did It Again" (from Oops!... I Did It Again, 2000)	Max Martin; Rami	Martin; Rami	3:33
5.	"Me Against the Music" (featuring Madonna) (from In the Zone, 2003)	Britney Spears; Madonna; C. "Tricky" Stewart; Thabiso "Tab" Nikhereanye; Penelope Magnet; Terius Nash; Gary O'Brien	Trixster; Magnet^{[a]}	3:45
6.	"Stronger" (from Oops!... I Did It Again, 2000)	Martin; Rami	Martin; Rami	3:26
7.	"Everytime" (from In the Zone, 2003)	Spears; Annette Stamatelatos	Guy Sigsworth	3:51
8.	"...Baby One More Time" (from ...Baby One More Time, 1999)	Martin	Martin; Rami	3:32
9.	"(You Drive Me) Crazy" (The Stop! Remix) (from ...Baby One More Time, 1999)	Jörgen Elofsson; Per Magnusson; David Kreuger; Martin	Martin; Rami	3:18
10.	"Boys" (The Co-Ed Remix) (featuring Pharrell Williams) (from Britney, 2001)	Hugo; Williams	The Neptunes	3:47
11.	"Sometimes" (from ...Baby One More Time, 1999)	Elofson	Magnusson; Kreuger; Elofson^{[a]}	4:07
12.	"Overprotected" (The Darkchild Remix) (from Britney, 2001)	Martin; Rami	Martin; Rami; Rodney Jerkins^{[b]}	3:07
13.	"Lucky" (from Oops!... I Did It Again, 2000)	Martin; Rami; Alexander Kronlund	Martin; Rami	3:26
14.	"Outrageous" (from In My Zone, 2003)	R. Kelly	Kelly; Trixter^{[c]}; Magnet^{[c]}	3:29
15.	"I'm Not a Girl, Not Yet a Woman" (from Britney, 2001)	Martin; Rami; Dido	Martin; Rami	3:51
16.	"I've Just Begun (Having My Fun)"	Spears; Michelle Bell; Karlsson; Winnberg; Jonback	Bloodshy & Avant	3:23
17.	"Do Somethin'"	Karlsson; Winnberg; Jonback; Angela Hunte	Bloodshy & Avant	3:22
Total length:				60:14

International bonus tracks
No.	Title	Writer(s)	Producer(s)	Length
15.	"Born to Make You Happy" (from ..Baby One More Time, 1999)	Kristian Lundin; Andreas Carlsson	Lundin	4:04
16.	"I Love Rock 'n' Roll" (from Britney, 2001)	Jake Hooker; Alan Merrill	Jerkins	3:08
Total length:				67:37

Australian, Japanese and UK bonus track
No.	Title	Writer(s)	Producer(s)	Length
15.	"Don't Let Me Be the Last to Know" (from Oops!... I Did It Again, 2000)	Robert John "Mutt" Lange; Shania Twain; Keith Scott	Lange	3:50
Total length:				71:27

=== Disc two ===
Limited edition
No.	Title	Writer(s)	Producer(s)	Length
1.	"Toxic" (Armand Van Helden Remix Edit)	Dennis; Karlsson; Winnberg; Jonback	Bloodshy & Avant; Armand Van Helden^{[b]}	6:24
2.	"Everytime" (Hi-Bias Radio Remix)	Spears; Stamatelatos	Sigsworth; Nick "Fierce" Fiorucci^{[b]}; Taras^{[b]}	3:26
3.	"Breathe on Me" (Jacques Lu Cont Mix)	Stephen Lee; Steve Anderson; Lisa Greene	Mark Taylor; Jacques Lu Cont^{[b]}	8:08
4.	"Outrageous" (Junkie XL's Dancehall Mix)	Kelly	Junkie XL	2:56
5.	"Chris Cox Megamix (Note: "Chris Cox Megamix" comprises "...Baby One More Time", "(You Drive Me) Crazy", "I'm a Slave 4 U", "Oops!... I Did It Again", "Stronger", "Everytime", "Overprotected" and "Toxic".)"		Cox	4:57
Total length:				25:51

International bonus tracks
No.	Title	Writer(s)	Producer(s)	Length
5.	"Stronger" (Miguel 'Migs' Vocal Mix)	Martin; Rami	Martin; Rami; Miguel Migs^{[b]}	6:31
6.	"I'm a Slave 4 U" (Thunderpuss Club Mix)	Hugo; Williams	The Neptunes; Thunderpuss^{[b]}	8:46
Total length:				44:18

=== Notes ===
- ^{^[a]} signifies a co-producer
- ^{^[b]} signifies an additional producer
- ^{^[c]} signifies a vocal producer
- "My Prerogative" is a cover of the 1988 song of the same title by Bobby Brown.
- Bonus tracks are inserted into the existing track sequence, advancing all subsequent entries by one position without omitting any original songs.
- Hong Kong edition only includes the Chris Cox Megamix and its music video on disc two.
- Disc three includes the DVD Greatest Hits: My Prerogative.

== Personnel ==
Credits are adapted from the liner notes of Greatest Hits: My Prerogative.

- John Amatiello – Pro Tools engineering (tracks 4, 6, 12, 13 and 18), Vocalwestefoolaway engineering (tracks 12 and 18)
- J.D. Andrew – engineering assistance (track 2)
- Dido Armstrong – songwriting (track 18)
- Steve Bearsley – engineering assistance (track 14)
- Michelle Bell – backing vocals (track 19), songwriting (track 19)
- BlackCell – backing vocals (tracks 1, 2, 19 and 20)
- Bloodshy & Avant – arrangement (tracks 1, 2, 19 and 20), digital editing (tracks 1, 2, 19 and 20), engineering (tracks 1, 2, 19 and 20), instrumentation (track 1, 2, 19 and 20), production (tracks 1, 2, 19 and 20), programming (tracks 1, 2, 19 and 20), songwriting (tracks 2, 19 and 20)
- Daniel Boom – engineering assistance (track 9)
- BossLady – backing vocals (track 12)
- Bobby Brown – songwriting (track 1)
- Ann Marie Bush – backing vocals (track 17)
- C^{2} – Pro Tools engineering (track 15), programming (track 15)
- Johan Carlberg – guitar (tracks 4, 8 and 9)
- Andreas Carlsson – songwriting (track 16)
- Sue Ann Carwell – backing vocals (track 17)
- Corey Chase – scratches (track 17)
- Andrew Coleman – engineering (tracks 3 and 10)
- Tyler Collins – backing vocals (track 17)
- Fran Cooper – make-up
- Courtney Copeland – backing vocals (track 5)
- Tom Coyne – mastering (disc one)
- Cathy Dennis – backing vocals (track 2), songwriting (track 2)
- Deann Dover – backing vocals (track 17)
- Dan Dymtrow – management representation
- Jörgen Elofsson – keyboards (track 11), production (track 11), songwriting (tracks 9 and 11)
- Roxanne Estrada – backing vocals (tracks 5 and 14)
- The Fanchoir – backing vocals (tracks 4 and 9)
- The Fanchoir 2 – backing vocals (track 13)
- Niklas Flyckt – mixing (tracks 1, 2, 19 and 20)
- Andy Gallas – engineering (track 14)
- Michel Gallone – engineering assistance (track 15), mix engineering (track 15)
- Abel Garibaldi – engineering (track 14), programming (track 14)
- Brian Garten – engineering (track 3)
- Stephen George – Pro Tools engineering (track 9)
- Şerban Ghenea – mixing (tracks 3, 5, 10 and 14)
- Brad Gilderman – engineering (track 17)
- Lori Goldstein – styling
- Nigel Green – mixing (track 15)
- Gene Griffin – songwriting (track 1)
- Rob Haggert – engineering assistance (track 5)
- Damion Hall – backing vocals (track 17)
- John Hanes – digital editing (tracks 5 and 14)
- Chaz Harper – mastering (disc two)
- Nana Hedin – backing vocals (tracks 4, 6, 8, 13 and 16)
- Emma Holmgren – backing vocals (tracks 1 and 2)
- Jake Hooker – songwriting (track 17)
- Jean-Marie Horvat – mixing (track 17)
- Chad Hugo – additional production (track 10), instrumentation (tracks 3 and 10), production (tracks 3 and 10), remix production (track 10), songwriting (tracks 3 and 10)
- Angela Hunte – backing vocals (track 20), songwriting (track 20)
- Janson & Janson – string arrangement (tracks 2 and 19), string conduction (tracks 2 and 19)
- Rodney Jerkins – production (track 17), remix engineering (track 12), remix instrumentation (track 12), remix mixing (track 12), remix production (track 12)
- Henrik Jonback – guitar (tracks 1, 2, 19 and 20), songwriting (tracks 2, 19 and 20)
- R. Kelly – backing vocals (track 14), mixing (track 14), production (track 14), songwriting (track 14)
- David Kreuger – production (track 11), programming (track 11), songwriting (track 9)
- Alexander Kronlund – songwriting (track 13)
- Robert John "Mutt" Lange – production (track 15), songwriting (track 15)
- Marc Lee – engineering assistance (track 17)
- Tobias Lehmann – vocal engineering (track 1)
- Uwe Lietzow – logic audio operation (track 1)
- Thomas Lindberg – bass (tracks 2, 4, 8, 9, 11, 18 and 19)
- Kristian Lundin – keyboards (track 16), production (track 16), programming (track 16), songwriting (track 16)
- Steve Lunt – A&R, arrangement (tracks 1, 2, 5, 19 and 20)
- Donnie Lyle – guitar (track 14)
- Madonna – songwriting (track 5), vocals (track 5)
- Penelope Magnet – arrangement (track 5), backing vocals (tracks 5 and 14), production (track 5), songwriting (track 5), vocal arrangement (track 14), vocal production (track 14)
- Per Magnusson – keyboards (track 11), production (track 11), songwriting (track 9)
- Fabian Marasciullo – engineering (track 17), remix engineering (track 12), remix mixing (track 12)
- Max Martin – backing vocals (tracks 6, 8, 9, 13 and 18), engineering (tracks 4, 6, 8 and 12), guitar (track 12), keyboards (tracks 4, 6 and 13), mixing (tracks 4, 6, 8, 9, 12, 13 and 18), production (tracks 4, 6, 8, 9, 13 and 18), programming (tracks 4, 6 and 13), songwriting (tracks 4, 6, 8, 9, 12, 13 and 18), vocals (track 4)
- Charles McCrorey – engineering assistance (tracks 5, 12 and 18–20)
- Sean McGhee – editing (track 7), engineering (track 7), mixing (track 7)
- Chris McMillan – hair
- Ian Mereness – engineering (track 14), programming (track 14)
- Alan Merrill – songwriting (track 17)
- Richard Meyer – Pro Tools engineering (track 15), programming (track 15)
- Jason Mlodzinski – engineering assistance (track 14)
- Maxayn Moriguchi – backing vocals (track 17)
- Jackie Murphy – art direction
- Terius Nash – songwriting (track 5)
- Kendall Nesbitt – keyboards (track 14)
- Thabiso "Tab" Nkhereanye – songwriting (track 5)
- Gary O'Brien – guitar (track 5)
- Esbjörn Öhrwall – acoustic guitar (track 11), guitar (tracks 4, 9, 13, 16 and 18)
- Jeanette Olsson – backing vocals (tracks 18 and 19)
- Paul Oliveira – vocal engineering assistance (track 15)
- Jonas Östman – engineering assistance (tracks 2, 19 and 20)
- Jeff Pescetto – backing vocals (track 17)
- Rami – backing vocals (track 9), engineering (tracks 4, 6, 8, 12 and 13), keyboards (tracks 4, 6 and 13), mixing (tracks 4, 6, 8, 9, 12, 13 and 18), production (tracks 4, 6, 8, 9, 12, 13 and 18), programming (tracks 4, 6 and 13), songwriting (tracks 4, 6, 12, 13 and 18)
- Edward Teddy Riley – songwriting (track 1)
- Emma Roads – backing vocals (track 1)
- Tim Roberts – engineering assistance (tracks 3, 5 and 7)
- Matthew Rolston – photography
- Larry Rudolph – management
- Reza Safina – engineering assistance (track 16)
- Daniel Savio – turntable (track 12)
- Jason Scheff – backing vocals (track 17)
- Keith Scott – songwriting (track 15)
- Guy Sigsworth – instrumentation (track 7), production (track 7)
- Ryan Smith – engineering assistance (track 3)
- Tom Soares – drum engineering (track 19)
- Jeanette Söderholm – backing vocals (track 9)
- Britney Spears – arrangement (track 5), songwriting (tracks 5, 7 and 19), vocals (all tracks)
- Annette Stamatelatos – songwriting (track 7)
- David Stamm – remix A&R direction
- Mark "Spike" Stent – mixing (track 5), vocal engineering (track 5)
- Christopher Stewart – arrangement (track 5), instrumentation (track 5), production (track 5), programming (track 5), songwriting (track 5), vocal arrangement (track 7), vocal production (track 7)
- Stockholm Session Strings – strings (tracks 2 and 19)
- Rich Tapper – engineering assistance (track 14)
- Brian "B-Luv" Thomas – digital editing (tracks 5 and 14), vocal engineering (track 14)
- Chris Thompson – backing vocals (track 17)
- David Treahearn – engineering assistance (track 5)
- Chris Trevett – vocal engineering (track 15)
- Michael "PGA Tour" Tucker – Pro Tools engineering (tracks 12 and 16), vocal engineering (track 18)
- Shania Twain – songwriting (track 15)
- Paul Umboch – guitar (track 17)
- Javier Valverde – engineering assistance (track 17)
- Anders von Hoffsten – backing vocals (track 11)
- Seth Waldmann – engineering assistance (track 7)
- Courtney Walter – art direction, design
- P-Dub Walton – digital editing (track 5)
- Jennifer Webster – management representation
- Will Wheaton – backing vocals (track 17)
- Nathan Wheeler – engineering assistance (track 14)
- Pharrell Williams – additional production (track 10), instrumentation (tracks 3 and 10), production (tracks 3 and 10), remix production (track 10), songwriting (tracks 3 and 10), vocals (track 10)
- Steve Wolf – drums (track 19)

== Charts ==
=== Weekly charts ===
2004–2005 weekly chart performance
Chart (2004–2005)	Peak position
Australian Albums (ARIA)	4
Australian Music DVD (ARIA)	1
Austrian Albums (Ö3 Austria)	4
Belgian Albums (Ultratop Flanders)	5
Belgian Albums (Ultratop Wallonia)	2
Canadian Albums (Billboard)	3
Danish Albums (Hitlisten)	2
Dutch Albums (Album Top 100)	7
Dutch Music DVD (MegaCharts)	12
European Top 100 Albums (Billboard)	3
Finnish Albums (Suomen virallinen lista)	2
French Compilation Albums (SNEP)	1
German Albums (Offizielle Top 100)	4
Greek Albums (IFPI)	1
Hungarian Albums (MAHASZ)	8
Hungarian Music DVD (MAHASZ)	2
Icelandic Albums (Tónlist)	7
Irish Albums (IRMA)	1
Italian Albums (FIMI)	7
Italian Music DVD (FIMI)	5
Japanese Albums (Oricon)	1
Japanese Music DVD (Oricon)	2
Malaysian Albums (RIM)	2
New Zealand Albums (RMNZ)	17
Norwegian Albums (VG-lista)	4
Polish Albums (ZPAV)	23
Portuguese Albums (AFP)	5
Scottish Albums (Official Charts)	1
Singaporean Albums (RIAS)	1
South African Albums (RISA)	7
Spanish Albums (PROMUSICAE)	8
Swedish Albums (Sverigetopplistan)	14
Swiss Albums (Schweizer Hitparade)	6
Swiss Albums (Schweizer Hitparade) DVD	52
Taiwanese Albums (Five Music)	1
UK Albums (Official Charts)	2
US Billboard 200	4
US Music Video Sales (Billboard)	3

2011 weekly chart performance
Chart (2011)	Peak position
French Albums (SNEP)	85

Weekly chart performance during 2023
Chart (2023)	Peak position
Spanish Albums (PROMUSICAE)	36

=== Monthly charts ===
2004–2005 weekly chart performance
Chart (2004)	Peak position
Argentine Albums (CAPIF)	5

=== Year-end charts ===
2004 year-end chart performance
Chart (2004)	Position
Australian Albums (ARIA)	47
Austrian Albums (Ö3 Austria)	73
Belgian Albums (Ultratop Flanders)	53
Belgian Albums (Ultratop Wallonia)	28
Danish Albums (Hitlisten)	30
Dutch Albums (Album Top 100)	91
Finnish Albums (Suomen virallinen lista)	13
Irish Albums (IRMA)	8
Italian Albums (FIMI)	51
Japanese Albums (Oricon)	38
South Korean International Albums (MIAK)	9
Swedish Albums (Sverigetopplistan)	71
UK Albums (OCC)	25
Worldwide Albums (IFPI)	13

2005 year-end chart performance
Chart (2005)	Position
Australian Albums (ARIA)	64
Australian Music DVD (ARIA)	32
Belgian Albums (Ultratop Wallonia)	81
Italian Albums (FIMI)	72
Japanese Albums (Oricon)	40
South Korean International Albums (MIAK)	4
UK Albums (OCC)	135
US Billboard 200	74

== Certifications ==
Certifications and sales
Region	Certification	Certified units/sales
Argentina (CAPIF)	Gold	20,000^{^}
Australia (ARIA)	2× Platinum	140,000^{^}
Australia (ARIA) DVD	2× Platinum	30,000^{^}
Austria (IFPI Austria)	Gold	15,000^{*}
Belgium (BRMA)	Gold	25,000^{*}
Canada (Music Canada)	Platinum	100,000^{‡}
Denmark (IFPI Danmark)	3× Platinum	60,000^{‡}
Finland (Musiikkituottajat)	Platinum	30,623
France (SNEP)	2× Gold	200,000^{*}
France (SNEP) DVD	Platinum	20,000^{*}
Germany (BVMI)	Gold	100,000^{^}
Greece (IFPI Greece)	Gold	10,000^{^}
Hong Kong (IFPI Hong Kong)	Gold	10,000^{*}
Hungary (MAHASZ)	Gold	10,000^{^}
Japan (RIAJ)	Million	1,000,000
Japan (RIAJ) DVD	Gold	100,000^{^}
Mexico (AMPROFON)	Gold	50,000^{^}
Mexico (AMPROFON) DVD	Gold	10,000^{^}
New Zealand (RMNZ)	Gold	7,500^{^}
Norway (IFPI Norway)	Gold	20,000^{*}
Portugal (AFP)	Platinum	40,000^{^}
Russia (NFPF)	2× Platinum	40,000^{*}
South Korea (RIAK)	—	79,136 (Note: In South Korea, Greatest Hits: My Prerogative sold 39,175 copies by the end of 2004, and sold additional 39,961 copies throughout 2005, according to the Recording Industry Association Korea (RIAK), bringing the sales total to 79,136 copies.)
Spain (Promusicae)	Gold	50,000^{^}
Switzerland (IFPI Switzerland)	Gold	20,000^{^}
Taiwan (IFPI Taiwan)	—	110,000
United Kingdom (BPI)	3× Platinum	1,000,000
United States (RIAA)	Platinum	1,800,000
United States (RIAA) DVD	2× Platinum	200,000^{^}
Summaries
Europe (IFPI)	Platinum	1,000,000^{*}
Worldwide	—	5,000,000
^{*} Sales figures based on certification alone.^{^} Shipments figures based on certification alone.^{‡} Sales+streaming figures based on certification alone.

== Release history ==
Release dates and formats
Region	Date	Format(s)	Label(s)	Ref.
Sweden	November 3, 2004	CD	Sony BMG	
Japan	November 4, 2004	Double CD	BMG Japan	
France	November 8, 2004	CD; double CD; DVD	Jive	
Germany	November 8, 2004	Double CD; DVD	Sony BMG	
South Korea	November 8, 2004	Cassette; CD	Sony BMG	
United Kingdom	November 8, 2004	CD; double CD; DVD	Jive	
United States	November 9, 2004	CD; double CD; DVD	Jive	
Japan	November 10, 2004	CD	BMG Japan	
Spain	November 11, 2004	CD	Sony BMG	
Australia	November 15, 2004	Double CD; DVD	Sony BMG	
Germany	November 15, 2004	CD	Sony BMG	
Australia	November 22, 2004	CD	Sony BMG	
Japan	December 8, 2004	DVD	BMG Japan	
United States	March 31, 2023	Vinyl (Note: Prior to the 2023 vinyl release, Greatest Hits: My Prerogative was made available on limited-edition vinyl exclusively at Urban Outfitters on November 6, 2020.)	Legacy	
Various	May 26, 2023	Vinyl	Sony	

== See also ==
- The Singles Collection
- Britney Spears discography
- List of number-one albums of 2004 (Ireland)
- List of Oricon number-one albums of 2004
