= My Prerogative =

1988 single by Bobby Brown

Single by Bobby Brown

from the album Don't Be Cruel
- B-side: "Girl Next Door"
- Released: 1988
- Studio: Axis (New York City)
- Genre: New jack swing
- Length: 4:51 (album version); 4:25 (single version)
- Label: MCA
- Songwriters: Bobby Brown; Gene Griffin; Teddy Riley
- Producers: Teddy Riley; Bobby Brown (co.)

Bobby Brown singles chronology
"Don't Be Cruel" (1988)	"My Prerogative" (1988)	"Roni" (1988)

Music video
- "My Prerogative" on YouTube

"My Prerogative" is a song by American singer Bobby Brown from his second studio album, Don't Be Cruel (1988). It was released in 1988 as the second single from the album. After recording sessions were completed, Brown and producer Gene Griffin traveled to New York City, since he felt something was "missing" from the record. "My Prerogative" was written by Brown as a response to the criticism he received for his firing from New Edition. He explained the song was about making decisions in one's life and not caring about other people's judgment. "My Prerogative" is often considered as one of the first major songs in the new jack swing genre.

The song was positively received by critics and was nominated for a Soul Train Music Award in the category of Best R&B Urban Contemporary Single. It was also commercially successful, reaching number one in Billboard's Hot 100 and Hot R&B/Hip-Hop Songs charts. "My Prerogative" also reached top ten positions in many countries, such as Ireland, New Zealand, the Netherlands, and the United Kingdom. The music video for the song features Brown performing the song on stage with his band and dancers. The song was also performed at most of his concerts, usually as the last song of the set list. On the February 4, 1989, performance at Madison Square Garden, he was joined on stage by many popular rap artists and producers of the time.

"My Prerogative" has been covered and sampled by a number of artists from different genres, including Britney Spears. She released her cover in her first compilation, Greatest Hits: My Prerogative (2004). The cover was produced by Bloodshy & Avant and was noted for aptly referring to Spears's relationship with the media at the time. Although the song only appeared in component charts in the United States, Spears's cover surpassed Brown's version in some European countries, peaking at the top of the charts in Finland, Ireland, Italy and Norway and reaching the top ten in another fourteen countries.

== Background ==
Brown had already completed recording sessions for Don't Be Cruel in Los Angeles, California, but felt something was missing in the record. Said Brown, "I felt my album was lacking a strong, aggressive song and I thought, 'Where better than New York to come up with it'". He traveled to New York City, along with producer Gene Griffin. "My Prerogative" was written by Brown, Griffin, and Teddy Riley, and produced by Griffin and Brown. It was recorded at Axis Studios and mixed at Soundworks, in New York City. The track was mastered at Future Disc Systems in Hollywood, California. During an interview with The Hour in 1989, Brown explained the theme behind the song, saying, "A lot of things had been said about Bobby Brown, why was he doing this [a solo career]. It's my way of expressing to people it's your prerogative to do as you want, but make sure what you do is the right thing".

A CD single of remixes by Joe T. Vannelli was released on October 13, 1995, reaching number 17 in the UK Singles Chart. The radio edit from this was included on Brown's 1995 remix album, Two Can Play That Game.

== Composition ==
"My Prerogative"
A 29 second sample of Bobby Brown's "My Prerogative", where the chorus is played with strong background vocals.

"My Prerogative" is considered a new jack swing anthem, that merges hip hop beats with elements of synth-pop and soul. It features a triplet swing in the sixteenth note, as included in many of Riley's productions. Jake Brown said in his book Your body's calling me: music, love, sex & money (2003), that like most new jack swing songs from the late 1980s, it was composed by "punchy, street-savvy beats, with sexually energetic melodies and poppy choruses". The bassline of the track was described by Cam'Ron Davis of CMJ New Music Monthly as "truly sinister". According to the sheet music published at Musicnotes.com by EMI Music Publishing, the song is composed in the key of A minor, with a tempo of 120 beats per minute. Brown's vocal range spans from the high-note of C_{4} to A_{5}.

== Reception ==
Barry Michael Cooper of Spin said "My Prerogative" "sounds like gin-drenched, Roaring Twenties swing". Arion Berger of Rolling Stone called it "a grumpy and undeniably adult dance hit". "My Prerogative" was nominated for at the 3rd Soul Train Music Awards in the category of Best R&B Urban Contemporary Single by a Male, but lost to Michael Jackson's "Man in the Mirror". The following year, Spin listed the song at number 72 on the "100 Greatest Singles of All Time" list. It ranked at number 98 on VH1's "100 Greatest Songs of the 80's". The track is often referred to as Brown's signature song.

"My Prerogative" debuted on the U.S. Billboard Hot 100 during the week of October 22, 1988, at number 78. The following week, it jumped 17 positions to number 61, and the following week, it climbed another 16 positions to number 45. It entered the top 40 during its fourth week (number 33 on November 12, 1988), and on January 14, 1989, it peaked at the top position of the chart. "My Prerogative" ultimately spent 24 weeks on the Hot 100, 15 of which were in the top 40. The song also peaked at number one in Hot Black Singles (during the weeks of October 15 and 22, 1988), and at number seven on the Dance Club Play chart. It was certified gold by the Recording Industry Association of America (RIAA) for sales over 500,000 copies. In Canada, the song debuted on the RPM 100 Singles at position 98, on the issue dated December 23, 1989. In the United Kingdom, "My Prerogative" debuted at number 87 on December 10, 1988. On February 18, 1989, the song peaked at number six and stayed in the position for two weeks. Following the release of the remixes single on October 14, 1995, "My Prerogative" re-entered the UK charts at number 17, and stayed on the chart for two weeks. By October 17, 2015, it had sold 275,000 units in the country. Across Europe, the song reached the top ten in Ireland and the Netherlands, and the top 20 in Germany and Sweden. In Australia and New Zealand, the track peaked at number 40 and number three, respectively.

== Music video ==
The music video for "My Prerogative" was directed by Alek Keshishian. It begins with Brown driving a car while his musicians start to perform the song on stage in front of a large crowd. Shortly after, he descends to the stage in an elevator, wearing a black jumpsuit and a headset. He dances flanked by two women playing a keytar and a saxophone.

J. D. Considine of Rolling Stone wrote in the review of Bobby (1992), "As anyone who saw him swagger through the videos for 'My Prerogative' and 'Every Little Step' can attest, Brown had a phenomenal ability to convey a sense of street toughness that was utterly without malice or menace, making him credible and likable". The music video was nominated at the 1989 MTV Video Music Awards for Best Stage Performance in a Video, but lost to the music video of Living Colour's "Cult of Personality". It also charted at number nine on RPM video chart on July 21, 1990.

== Live performances ==
"My Prerogative" was performed during his tour in promotion for Don't Be Cruel as the last song of the night. Brown usually performed it wearing a black outfit, flanked with two male dancers wearing white clothes. On the February 4, 1989, show at Madison Square Garden in New York City, Brown wore a red boxing robe with the words "King of the Stage" printed on the back. During the performance, Joseph Simmons of Run-DMC, LL Cool J and Heavy D joined him onstage and freestyle rapped. Eric B., KRS-One, L. A. Reid, Babyface and Teddy Riley also joined him onstage, with the latter performing a keyboard solo. Peter Watrous of The New York Times commented that, "The communal scene on stage mirrored the feeling in the audience; everybody seemed aware that this was a generation that had rewritten the rules of pop entertainment, and was justifiably proud of its achievement". Brown also performed the song on the 1996–97 Home Again reunion tour with New Edition, during the second portion of the show in which he performed hits from his solo career. On November 10, 2005, he performed the song for the first time in eight years at a concert at House of Blues in Atlantic City. He wore a white suit and matching hat, and sang it as the last song of the evening. On January 17, 2006, he performed it at a New Edition show in Atlantic City's Trump Taj Mahal. During the performance, he tore open his orange dress shirt, singing bare-chested with a tie and a fur coat on. Brown performed the song during his 2007 July shows in Australia.

== Track listing ==
- US 7-inch single (MCA 53383)
1. "My Prerogative" (single version) – 4:25
2. "My Prerogative" (instrumental) – 4:25
- US 12-inch single (MCA 23888)
1. "My Prerogative" (extended remix) – 8:00
2. "Girl Next Door" (extended version) – 6:30
3. "My Prerogative" (instrumental) – 5:18

== Credits and personnel ==
- Bobby Brown – lead vocals, composer, co-production
- Gene Griffin – songwriting, production
- Teddy Riley – songwriting, background vocals, keyboards, mixing
- Dennis Mitchell – engineering, mixing, recording
- Jim Hanneman – engineering, mixing, recording
- Markell Riley – drum programming
- Aaron Hall – background vocals
- Bernard Belle – background vocals
- Lee Drakeford – background vocals

== Charts ==
=== Weekly charts ===
Chart (1988–1989)	Peak position
Australia (ARIA)	40
Belgium (Ultratop 50 Flanders)	10
Canada Retail Singles (The Record)	2
Canada Top Singles (RPM)	5
Ireland (IRMA)	9
Netherlands (Dutch Top 40)	5
Netherlands (Single Top 100)	7
New Zealand (RIANZ)	3
Sweden (Topplistan)	12
UK Singles (Official Charts)	6
US Billboard Hot 100	1
US Dance Club Play (Billboard)	7
US Hot Black Singles (Billboard)	1
US Cash Box Top 100	2
West Germany (Media Control)	15

Chart (1995)	Peak position
UK Singles (OCC)	17

=== Year-end charts ===
Chart (1988)	Position
US Hot Black Singles (Billboard)	29

Chart (1989)	Position
Belgium (Ultratop)	72
Canada Top Singles (RPM)	98
Netherlands (Dutch Top 40)	61
Netherlands (Single Top 100)	67
New Zealand (RIANZ)	27
UK Singles (OCC)	54
US Billboard Hot 100	2
West Germany (Media Control)	80

== Certifications ==
Region	Certification	Certified units/sales
United States (RIAA)	Gold	500,000^{^}
^{^} Shipments figures based on certification alone.

== Britney Spears version ==
"My Prerogative"

Single by Britney Spears

from the album Greatest Hits: My Prerogative
- B-side: "I've Just Begun (Having My Fun)"; "Chris Cox Megamix"
- Released: September 20, 2004
- Recorded: May 2004
- Studio: Teldex (Berlin); Murlyn (Stockholm)
- Genre: Synth-pop
- Length: 3:33
- Label: Jive
- Songwriters: Bobby Brown; Gene Griffin; Teddy Riley
- Producers: Bloodshy & Avant

Britney Spears singles chronology
"Outrageous" (2004)	"My Prerogative" (2004)	"Do Somethin'" (2005)

Music video
- "My Prerogative" on YouTube

=== Recording and production ===
"My Prerogative"
A 21-second sample of "My Prerogative", in which Spears sings over a background of synthesizers.

In 2004, American singer Britney Spears recorded a cover of "My Prerogative" with Swedish production team Bloodshy & Avant, who produced her single "Toxic" from her fourth studio album, In the Zone (2003). Bloodshy & Avant recorded the song at Murlyn Studios in Stockholm, Sweden. Spears recorded the vocals at Teldex Studios in Berlin, Germany during the European leg of her The Onyx Hotel Tour in 2004. On August 13, 2004, Spears's label Jive Records announced through a press release that she had covered the song and was planning to release it on her first greatest hits compilation, titled Greatest Hits: My Prerogative. The song was set to premiere on radio stations on September 14, however, it leaked via Real Tapemasters Inc.'s mixtape The Future of R&B on September 10.

=== Music and lyrics ===
"My Prerogative" is set in common time and has a moderate tempo of 100 beats per minute. It is written in the key of B♭ minor and follows the chord progression of B♭m–F–B♭m throughout, making it in the harmonic minor scale. Spears's cover of the song is musically different from its original version, with the bass and new jack swing sound replaced with a synthpop sound, synthesizers and elements typical of Bloodshy & Avant productions. It was noted by Christy Lemire of Today that the cover also contains elements of Bollywood music. This impression is, however, inaccurate, as the song instead samples Warda's Arabic song "Batwanes Beek". The musical influences therefore originate from the Arabic region, not from Bollywood or South Asian elements.

At the beginning of the song, Spears says in a breathy voice the lines "People can take everything away from you / But they can never take away your truth / But the question is, can you handle mine?". The rest of the lyrics do not deviate much from the original version, though they are changed to fit a woman's perspective. Jennifer Vineyard of MTV commented the cover could be interpreted as a statement on Spears's life and the media reaction to some of her decisions at the time, including her engagement to American dancer Kevin Federline.

=== Critical reception ===
The cover received mixed reviews from contemporary critics. Stephen Thomas Erlewine of AllMusic called the cover "a useless remake, which seems to exist solely for its video". Spence D. of IGN said that the lyrics fit perfectly with Spears's relationship with the media at the time. He also added: "As for her interpretation, it's an interesting chameleonic diversion that comes off like a mash-up between vintage Prince-styled production, Cameo swagger, and Madonna sultriness, but never seems to capture the gloss and glory of any of the aforementioned influences". Lemire called it "utterly unnecessary". Louis Pattison of the New Musical Express commented that "judging by the fuck-you sentiments" of the cover, Spears liked to play the role of "[the] pop brat careering off the rails". Sarah Hepola of Salon wrote in an article about contemporary teen idols that the cover "became an anthem for teen-idol rebellion". In an interview on Club Shay Shay, Brown criticized Spears's cover and felt that she "butchered" the song.

=== Commercial performance ===
In the United States, "My Prerogative" failed to chart on the Billboard Hot 100 but charted on the Top 40 Tracks and Mainstream Top 40 at numbers 22 and 34, respectively. By 2011, "My Prerogative" had sold 374,000 paid digital downloads in the United States. On November 15, 2004, the song debuted on the Australian Singles Chart at number seven. It received a gold certification from the Australian Recording Industry Association (ARIA) for shipments over 35,000 units. The same week, it debuted at number 17 in New Zealand.

On November 7, "My Prerogative" debuted at number three in the United Kingdom, during a competitive week of new releases, being surpassed by Eminem's "Just Lose It" and Destiny's Child's "Lose My Breath". According to the Official Charts Company (OCC), the song has sold 130,000 copies in the UK. The song also achieved commercial success throughout Europe, peaking at number one in Finland, Ireland, Italy and Norway, number two in Spain and number three in Belgium (both Flanders and Wallonia), Denmark and Germany. It also reached the top ten in Austria, Czech Republic, Sweden, Switzerland and the Netherlands.

=== Music video ===
The music video for "My Prerogative" was filmed in August 2004 at The Paramour Mansion in Silver Lake, Los Angeles and was directed by Jake Nava. It premiered on MTV's TRL on September 16, 2004, and on BET's 106 & Park on January 18, 2005. According to Spears's mother Lynne, the video was "about capturing gorgeous close-ups and very subtle movement" since Spears could not do any choreography due to her knee injury at the "Outrageous" music video shoot. She also described the video as "[having] an element of old Hollywood glamour and mystery".

The music video begins with Spears driving a Porsche 928 at high speed in the Hollywood Hills. She crashes through a fence and lands into a pool inside a manor where a party is taking place. She emerges from the water and crawls in top of the car to sing the first verse. Spears's brother, Bryan, makes a cameo in these scenes. After she leaves the pool, she enters the manor and passes couples making out around her. She appears in a stainless steel kitchen, where a maid cuts the straps of her black wet dress. In the next scene, she walks into a study in which her then-fiancé, Kevin Federline, is smoking and watching a black-and-white video of Spears on a projection screen. According to Jennifer Vineyard from MTV, the clip had the style of pornographic films from the 1940s and 1950s. Rolling Stone in their article "Britney Spears: The Complete Video Guide", compared it to Madonna's performances of her 1984 single "Like a Virgin". She then entered a dressing room with mirrors, wearing lingerie, high heels, stockings and a short fur jacket. She proceeds to a bedroom, in which a black dress is laid out on the comforter. She puts on the new dress and the camera cuts to the party outside where people gathered waiting. During the song's bridge, it is revealed that the party is actually Spears's wedding, as she starts walking towards the aisle and Federline waits next to a priest. The video ends with a shot of the black-and-white video and Spears looking into the camera. The black-and-white footage was released as an alternate version of the music video in the 2004 DVD Greatest Hits: My Prerogative.

=== Track listings and formats ===
- European, Australian and Japanese maxi CD single
1. "My Prerogative" – 3:36
2. "My Prerogative" (instrumental) – 3:36
3. "My Prerogative" (X-Press 2 vocal mix) – 7:21
4. "My Prerogative" (Armand Van Helden remix edit) – 7:37
5. "My Prerogative" (X-Press 2 dub) – 7:19
- UK CD single
1. "My Prerogative" – 3:37
2. "Chris Cox Megamix" – 5:16
- UK DVD single
1. "My Prerogative" (music video) – 3:47
2. "My Prerogative" (photo gallery) – 3:34
- UK promotional 12-inch vinyl
1. "My Prerogative" (Armand Van Helden remix) – 7:49
2. "My Prerogative" (X-Press 2 vocal mix) – 7:19
3. "Chris Cox Megamix" – 5:16
4. "My Prerogative" (X-Press 2 dub) – 7:19
- Digital EP
1. "My Prerogative" (X-Press 2 vocal mix) – 7:19
2. "My Prerogative" (X-Press 2 radio edit) – 4:20
3. "My Prerogative" (Armand Van Helden remix) – 7:38
4. "My Prerogative" (Armand Van Helden dub) – 7:36
- 2-track digital download
1. "My Prerogative" – 3:35
2. "I've Just Begun (Having My Fun)" – 3:22

=== Credits and personnel ===
- Britney Spears – lead vocals, background vocals
- Bloodshy & Avant – production, arrangements, all instruments, programming, vocal editing
- Steve Lunt – A&R, arrangements
- Nicklas Flyckt – mixing
- Tobias Lehmann – engineering
- Uwe Lietzow – recording
- Henrik Jonback – guitar
- BlackCell – background vocals
- Emma Holmgren – background vocals

=== Charts ===
==== Weekly charts ====
Chart (2004–2007)	Peak position
Australia (ARIA)	7
Austria (Ö3 Austria Top 40)	7
Belgium (Ultratop 50 Flanders)	3
Belgium (Ultratop 50 Wallonia)	3
Canada CHR/Pop Top 30 (Radio & Records)	16
CIS Airplay (TopHit)	14
Czech Republic (Rádio – Top 100)	4
Croatia (HRT)	8
Denmark (Tracklisten)	3
European Hot 100 Singles (Billboard)	2
European Radio Top 50 (Billboard)	17
Finland (Suomen virallinen lista)	1
France (SNEP)	18
Germany (GfK)	3
Greece (IFPI)	4
Hungary (Rádiós Top 40)	34
Hungary (Single Top 40)	5
Ireland (IRMA)	1
Italy (FIMI)	1
Japan (Oricon)	98
Netherlands (Dutch Top 40)	13
Netherlands (Single Top 100)	10
New Zealand (Recorded Music NZ)	17
Norway (VG-lista)	1
Romania (Romanian Top 100)	26
Russia Airplay (TopHit)	12
Scotland (OCC)	3
Spain (Promusicae)	2
Sweden (Sverigetopplistan)	6
Switzerland (Schweizer Hitparade)	4
Ukraine Airplay (TopHit)	22
UK Singles (OCC)	3
US Bubbling Under Hot 100 Singles (Billboard)	1
US Digital Song Sales (Billboard)	3
US Pop Airplay (Billboard)	22

==== Year-end charts ====
Chart (2004)	Position
Australia (ARIA)	93
Belgium (Ultratop 50 Flanders)	81
Belgium (Ultratop 50 Wallonia)	74
CIS (TopHit)	89
European Hot 100 Singles (Billboard)	64
Italy (FIMI)	33
Russia Airplay (TopHit)	58
Sweden (Hitlistan)	68
Switzerland (Schweizer Hitparade)	82
UK Singles (OCC)	69

=== Certifications and sales ===
Region	Certification	Certified units/sales
Australia (ARIA)	Gold	35,000^{^}
France	—	60,237
Norway (IFPI Norway)	Gold	5,000^{*}
United Kingdom (BPI)	Silver	200,000^{‡}
United States (RIAA)	Gold	500,000^{‡}
^{*} Sales figures based on certification alone.^{^} Shipments figures based on certification alone.^{‡} Sales+streaming figures based on certification alone.

=== Release history ===
Release dates and formats for "My Prerogative"
Region	Date	Format(s)	Label(s)	Ref.
United States	September 20, 2004	Contemporary hit radio; rhythmic contemporary radio	Jive	
Japan	October 20, 2004	Maxi CD	BMG Japan	
United Kingdom	October 30, 2004	Digital download	Jive	
Germany	November 1, 2004	CD; maxi CD	Sony BMG	
United Kingdom	November 1, 2004	CD; maxi CD	Jive	
France	November 2, 2004	Maxi CD	Jive	
Australia	November 8, 2004	Maxi CD	Sony BMG	
France	November 16, 2004	CD	Jive	
United States	January 11, 2005	Digital download (EP)	Jive	

== Other versions ==
"My Prerogative" has been covered and sampled by many artists from different genres. J.D. Considine of Rolling Stone noted that the hook of Brown's 1992 single "Humpin' Around" from Bobby, "bears a more than passing resemblance to the synth part from 'My Prerogative'". According to Entertainment Weekly, American R&B group U.N.V. sampled the melody for their 1993 single "Something's Goin' On". Jamaican reggae singer Beenie Man covered "My Prerogative" for his 1998 studio album Many Moods of Moses. American singer Rod Michael covered the song for his 2004 studio album, The Next Episode. Irish girl group Fab! used the song's main melody line for their 1999 song "Something's Gonna Have to Change". English rock band Selfish Cunt also covered the song for their 2004 studio album No Wicked Heart Shall Prosper, changing the name to "Bobby".

In July 2007, American basketball player LeBron James covered "My Prerogative" at the ESPY Awards, wearing a wig and Hammer pants. Vibe named the performance one of the "worst of the worst live performances of the year". Anoop Desai, contestant of the eight season of American Idol, covered the song for his wildcard round performance. It earned him the last spot in the finals, marking the first time the show ever had thirteen contestants. Desai also performed the song during the American Idols Live! Tour 2009. Graeme McRanor of The Vancouver Sun said in the concert review that "My Prerogative" "really shouldn't be covered by any artist, ever again". On July 31, 2009, American hip hop group The Pharcyde covered the song at the All Points West Music & Arts Festival in Jersey City. The song was also featured on the films Love & Basketball (2000), Wild Hogs (2007) and Sex Drive (2008). The song was performed in the 2013 Glee episode "Guilty Pleasures" by Jake Puckerman (Jacob Artist).

During the premiere episode of The Masked Singer, Pittsburgh Steelers wide receiver Antonio Brown covered "My Prerogative", incognito as a character known as "the Hippo". After losing to an unrevealed "Peacock" character (who was later revealed to be Donny Osmond), and subsequently being eliminated from the pool of contestants, Brown was required to reveal his identity.

== Bibliography ==
- Ripani, Richard J. (2006). The new blue music: changes in rhythm & blues, 1950-1999. William B. Eerdmans Publishing Company. ISBN 1-57806-861-4.
- Brown, Jake (2003). Your Body's Calling Me: Music, Love, Sex and Money - The Story of the Life and Times of "Robert" R. Kelly. Amber Books Publishing. ISBN 0-9727519-5-5.
- Campbell, Lisa D. (1993). Michael Jackson: the king of pop. Branden Books. ISBN 0-8283-1957-X.
