= Greatest Hits: My Prerogative (video) =

Video by Britney Spears
- Released: November 8, 2004
- Recorded: August 7, 1998–June 9, 2004
- Genres: Pop; dance-pop
- Length: 105 minutes
- Label: Jive
- Directors: Chris Applebaum; Gregory Dark; Nigel Dick; Paul Hunter; Wayne Isham; Joseph Kahn; David LaChapelle; Francis Lawrence; Dave Meyers; Jake Nava; Herb Ritts; Bille Woodruff

Britney Spears chronology
Britney Spears: In the Zone (2004)	Greatest Hits: My Prerogative (2004)	Britney & Kevin: Chaotic... the DVD & More (2005)

Greatest Hits: My Prerogative is the seventh video album by American singer Britney Spears. It was released on November 8, 2004, by Jive Records, accompanying the greatest hits album of the same title.

Designed by Jim Swaffield, Greatest Hits: My Prerogative contains all of Spears' music videos from 1998 to 2004, including unreleased material from the shoot of "Outrageous". It also contains alternate versions of the music videos with previously unreleased footage.

Greatest Hits: My Prerogative received widespread critical acclaim for its audiovisual quality and towards Spears for being the "ultimate video performer". A commercial success, it debuted at number three on the US Top Music Videos and has been certified double platinum by the Recording Industry Association of America (RIAA).

== Release ==
On August 13, 2004, Spears announced through Jive Records the release of her first greatest hits album, titled Greatest Hits: My Prerogative, for November 16. The video album of the same title would be released simultaneously, featuring Spears' music videos. The release date for both the album and the video was later moved up a week. The video took four months to be assembled, as crews from Jive combed through unedited and unused footage, instrumentals and alternative audio. It provided two menus—one with all of Spears' 1998–2004 music videos, as well as scenes from the unreleased video of "Outrageous", and the other with alternative versions containing unreleased footage for "...Baby One More Time", "(You Drive Me) Crazy", "Oops!... I Did It Again", "Stronger", "Don't Let Me Be the Last to Know", "I'm a Slave 4 U", "Toxic", "Everytime" and "My Prerogative". Among the highlights of the alternative takes were new vocal mixes in "(You Drive Me) Crazy" and "I'm a Slave 4 U", as well as a karaoke version of the nude diamond scene of "Toxic". The video also included hidden footage, such as the third alternative version of "My Prerogative".

== Critical reception ==
Professional ratings
Review scores
Source	Rating
AllMusic	4.5/5 stars
Rolling Stone	3/5 stars

Greatest Hits: My Prerogative received widespread critical acclaim upon its release. James Griffiths of The Guardian commented: "Here comes the Queen of Pop in a box so shiny you can see your face in it. Spears is described on the cover as 'the ultimate video performer', and watching the 20 promos contained within, it's difficult to argue. [...] Relentlessly thrusting herself at the camera, compulsively preening amid special FX galas, Britney is the MTV video age in human form." He also complimented the innovations of the menu, but added that "it's not particularly impressive" and "you need to be pretty nifty with your handset to find them." Music Week said: "The DVD version of Spears' high-flying 'best of' set adds bells and whistles to the audio version at only a slight premium pricewise. Twenty promo videos are included, all with top-notch sound and vision".

== Accolades ==
Awards and nominations for Greatest Hits: My Prerogative
Year	Award	Category	Nominee(s)	Result	Ref.
2005	Japan Gold Disc Award	International Music Videos of the Year	Greatest Hits: My Prerogative	Won	

== Commercial performance ==
In the United States, Greatest Hits: My Prerogative debuted at number three on the Top Music Videos chart dated November 27, 2004. It spent a total of 22 weeks on the chart. On December 15, the video was certified double platinum by the Recording Industry Association of America (RIAA) for shipments of 200,000 copies. In Australia, Greatest Hits: My Prerogative debuted atop of the ARIA Top 40 Music DVD chart dated November 22. It was certified double platinum by the Australian Recording Industry Association (ARIA) for shipments of 30,000 units. The video was also ranked at number 32 on the ARIA year-end DVD chart for 2005. In Hungary, the video debuted at number two on November 8, 2004. In France, it was certified platinum by the Syndicat National de l'Édition Phonographique (SNEP), for shipments of 15,000 copies. In Argentina, it was certified double platinum by the Argentine Chamber of Phonograms and Videograms Producers (CAPIF) on December 1, for shipments of 60,000 copies. On May 9, 2005, it was certified gold by the Asociación Mexicana de Productores de Fonogramas y Videogramas (AMPROFON) for shipments of 10,000 copies in Mexico. According to the Associação Brasileira dos Produtores de Discos (ABPD), Greatest Hits: My Prerogative was the world's second best-selling video of 2004.

== Track listing ==
No.	Title	Writer(s)	Director(s)	Length
1.	"My Prerogative"	Bobby Brown; Gene Griffin; Edward Teddy Riley	Jake Nava	3:48
2.	"Outrageous"	R. Kelly	Dave Meyers	0:44
3.	"Everytime"	Britney Spears; Annette Stamatelatos	David LaChapelle	4:07
4.	"Toxic"	Cathy Dennis; Christian Karlsson; Pontus Winnberg; Henrik Jonback	Joseph Kahn	3:33
5.	"Me Against the Music" (featuring Madonna)	Spears; Madonna; C. "Tricky" Stewart; Thabiso "Tab" Nikhereanye; Penelope Magnet; Terius Nash; Gary O'Brien	Paul Hunter	4:03
6.	"Boys" (The Co-Ed Remix) (featuring Pharrell Williams)	Chad Hugo; Williams	Meyers	3:37
7.	"I Love Rock 'n' Roll"	Jake Hooker; Alan Merrill	Chris Applebaum	3:07
8.	"I'm Not a Girl, Not Yet a Woman"	Max Martin; Rami Yacoub; Dido Armstrong	Wayne Isham	3:49
9.	"Overprotected" (The Darkchild Remix)	Martin; Yacoub	Applebaum	3:35
10.	"Overprotected"	Martin; Yacoub	Bille Woodruff	3:55
11.	"I'm a Slave 4 U"	Hugo; Williams	Francis Lawrence	3:24
12.	"Don't Let Me Be the Last to Know"	Robert John "Mutt" Lange; Shania Twain; Keith Scott	Herb Ritts	3:52
13.	"Stronger"	Martin; Yacoub	Kahn	3:38
14.	"Lucky"	Martin; Yacoub; Alexander Kronlund	Meyers	4:08
15.	"Oops!... I Did It Again"	Martin; Yacoub	Nigel Dick	4:12
16.	"From the Bottom of My Broken Heart"	Eric Foster White	Gregory Dark	4:30
17.	"Born to Make You Happy"	Kristian Lundin; Andreas Carlsson	Woodruff	3:39
18.	"(You Drive Me) Crazy" (The Stop Remix!)	Jörgen Elofsson; Per Magnusson; David Kreuger; Martin	Dick	3:20
19.	"Sometimes"	Elofson	Dick	3:53
20.	"...Baby One More Time"	Martin	Dick	3:59
Total length:				72:53

== Charts ==
=== Weekly charts ===
Chart (2004)	Peak position
Australian Music DVD (ARIA)	1
Dutch Music DVD (MegaCharts)	12
Hungarian Music DVD (MAHASZ)	2
Italian Music DVD (FIMI)	5
Japanese Music DVD (Oricon)	2
Swedish Music DVD (Sverigetopplistan)	3
Swiss Albums (Schweizer Hitparade)	52
US Music Video Sales (Billboard)	3

=== Year-end charts ===
Chart (2004)	Position
Worldwide Albums (IFPI)	2

Chart (2005)	Position
Australian Music DVD (ARIA)	32

== Certifications ==
Certifications and sales for Greatest Hits: My Prerogative
Region	Certification	Certified units/sales
Argentina (CAPIF)	3× Platinum	24,000^{^}
Australia (ARIA)	2× Platinum	30,000^{^}
France (SNEP)	Platinum	20,000^{*}
Japan (RIAJ)	Gold	100,000^{^}
Mexico (AMPROFON)	Gold	10,000^{^}
United States (RIAA)	2× Platinum	200,000^{^}
^{*} Sales figures based on certification alone.^{^} Shipments figures based on certification alone.

== Release history ==
Release dates and formats for Greatest Hits: My Prerogative
Region	Date	Format(s)	Label(s)	Ref.
Netherlands	November 8, 2004	DVD	Sony BMG	
United States	November 9, 2004	DVD	Jive	
Portugal	November 11, 2004	DVD	Sony BMG	
Japan	December 8, 2004	DVD	BMG Japan	
