= Outrageous (song) =

2004 single by Britney Spears

Single by Britney Spears

from the album In the Zone
- Released: July 13, 2004
- Recorded: 2003
- Studio: The Chocolate Factory (Chicago, IL); Battery Studios (New York, NY)
- Genre: Hip hop; R&B
- Length: 3:22
- Label: Jive
- Songwriter: Robert Kelly
- Producers: R. Kelly; Trixster; Penelope Magnet

Britney Spears singles chronology
"Everytime" (2004)	"Outrageous" (2004)	"My Prerogative" (2004)

Audio video
- "Outrageous" on YouTube

"Outrageous" is a song by American singer Britney Spears from her fourth studio album, In the Zone (2003). It was written and produced by R. Kelly, with vocal production provided by Trixster and Penelope Magnet. The song was released on July 13, 2004, by Jive Records, as the fourth and final single from In the Zone. "Outrageous" was the record label's choice for first or second single, but Spears pushed for "Me Against the Music" and "Toxic" respectively, to be released instead. It was finally announced as a single after it was selected as the theme song for the 2004 film Catwoman. "Outrageous" is a hip hop and R&B song with an exotic feel. Lyrically, it talks about materialism and entertainment. "Outrageous" received mixed reviews from critics. Some praised its funky sound, while others deemed it "forgettable".

"Outrageous" only charted in Japan, Romania, Russia and in the United States, entering many of Billboard's component charts and peaking at number 79 on the Billboard Hot 100. Spears only performed the song on 2004's The Onyx Hotel Tour. The music video was being shot in New York City in June 2004, when Spears hurt her knee and had to undergo arthroscopic surgery. The video was canceled, as well as remainder of The Onyx Hotel Tour and the feature in the Catwoman soundtrack. A composite of different scenes was released in the DVD Greatest Hits: My Prerogative (2004).

== Background ==
"Outrageous" was written and produced by R. Kelly, and was recorded at The Chocolate Factory, in Chicago, Illinois. Penelope Magnet and Christopher "Tricky" Stewart of production team RedZone were enlisted to produce Spears's vocals. She recorded them at Battery Studios in New York City. The song was later mixed by Serban Ghenea at MixStar Studios in Virginia Beach, Virginia. On September 11, 2003, "Outrageous" was confirmed as one of the tracks from In the Zone. Jive Records hoped the song would be released as the first single from the album, but Spears convinced them to release her collaboration with Madonna, "Me Against the Music". The track was also one of the choices for second single along with "(I Got That) Boom Boom", but Spears selected "Toxic" instead. On June 1, 2004, it was announced that "Outrageous" would be released as the fourth single from the album and would be sent to radio stations on June 29, 2004. It was also announced that the track would be the theme song from the 2004 film Catwoman. "Outrageous" was sent to mainstream radio in the United States on July 20, 2004.

== Music and lyrics ==
"Outrageous"
A 21-second sample of "Outrageous", which features Spears listing different things that give her pleasure.

"Outrageous" is a hip hop and R&B song. The beat was compared by Gavin Mueller of Stylus Magazine to R. Kelly's 2003 single "Snake". Jennifer Vineyard of MTV noted that "she whispers and moans [...] with a snake charmer melody giving the song an exotic feel". Nick Southall of Stylus Magazine compared the background vocals to those of Punjabi musician Nusrat Fateh Ali Khan. According to the sheetmusic published at Musicnotes.com by Universal Music Publishing Group, "Outrageous" is composed in the key of D major, with a tempo of 105 beats per minute. The song's lyrics talk about materialism and amusement, with Spears referencing in the chorus a number of things that give her pleasure, such as "my world tour" and "my sex drive". Vineyard noted, "the cumulative effect seems like it's designed to put the listener in the lover's shoes—taking full advantage of the aural male gaze". Sal Cinquemani of Slant Magazine said the track "includes a telling parallel that reveals a lot about one of music's biggest—as Alanis Morissette would put it—treadmill capitalists: she sings 'my sex drive' and 'my shopping spree' with the same dripping gusto".

== Critical reception ==
"Outrageous" received mixed reviews from music critics. Mim Udovitch of Blender called the song an "R. Kelly club number, [that] has a hot, odd compulsion and lyrics that are practically big-pimpin', Spears-style". William Shaw of Blender selected it as the ninth best Spears song, highlighting "the nonsense chants" at 1:10. While reviewing Greatest Hits: My Prerogative, Ann Powers commented, "'Outrageous' is R. Kelly's dirty little take on the ideal Janet Jackson song". Spence D. of IGN said of the song that "it's a somewhat derivative Egyptian lover groove number. Yet for all it's [sic] repetitiveness, it's still kind of funky and pervasive". Kelefa Sanneh of The New York Times called it "[a] composition that cruises along on autopilot for two minutes and then suddenly switches gears with a delectable Michael Jackson-inspired bridge". Annabel Leathes of the BBC stated that "R. Kelly transform[s] Britney into a grubby Beyoncé". Caryn Ganz of Spin called "Outrageous" a "go-nowhere homage to living fabulously". Dave de Sylvia of Sputnikmusic called it "a forgettable but nonetheless catchy single". David Browne of Entertainment Weekly said that along with "(I Got That) Boom Boom", "[they] are little more than wobbly, rhythm-based contraptions intended to advance Spears' sex-princess-on-the-loose image". Jamie Gill of Yahoo! Music Radio commented that, "with its cheap, tinny production – it would take a rather senile and unworldly old lady in Tonbridge Wells [sic] to find this even diverting, let alone shocking".

== Commercial performance ==
On August 14, 2004, "Outrageous" debuted at number 85 on the U.S. Billboard Hot 100. On August 28, 2004, it peaked at number 79. The same week, the song peaked at number twenty-three on Billboard's Pop Songs. It also reached number 27 on Billboard's Hot Dance Club Songs on September 11, 2004. "Outrageous" also reached number 14 on the Hot Dance Singles Sales chart. In Japan, "Outrageous" charted on the Oricon Albums Chart for eight weeks and peaked at number 31.

== Music video ==
The music video for "Outrageous" was directed by Dave Meyers, who previously worked in the music videos for "Lucky" and "Boys", as well as the Curious commercials. It was shot in outdoors locations in Queens and Manhattan, New York City. The music video was set to premiere on MTV on June 28, 2004. After completion of the scenes with guest star Snoop Dogg, Spears was shooting dance scenes in Manhattan when around 11:30 pm, she fell and injured her left knee. She was taken immediately to a local hospital, where doctors performed an MRI scan and found floating cartilage. The following day, Spears underwent arthroscopic surgery. Spears was forced to remain six weeks with a thigh brace, followed by eight to twelve weeks of rehabilitation, which caused the rest of the shoot as well as the remainder of The Onyx Hotel Tour to be canceled. "Outrageous" was also scrapped as the theme song from Catwoman. A 45-second music video composed of the scenes that were shot was released in the 2004 DVD Greatest Hits: My Prerogative. The video begins with Snoop Dogg and a group of men playing basketball in an outdoors court, until Spears appears wearing blue baggy shorts. She starts to flirt with him, before jumping into his arms and licking his beard. In the next scene, she performs with her dancers on a street at night.

== Live performances ==
Spears has only performed the song during the Onyx Hotel Tour in 2004. It was the last song of the fifth act of the show, titled "Security Cameras". She performed "Breathe on Me" wearing pink lingerie while emulating different sexual practices with her dancers. After it ended, she put on a white trench coat while her dancers wore them in black and performed "Outrageous". The act ended with a skit that segued into the finale performance of "(I Got That) Boom Boom".

== Track listings ==
- Japan CD maxi single
1. "Outrageous" (Album Version) – 3:24
2. "Outrageous" (Murk Space Miami Mix) – 6:50
3. "Outrageous" (Junkie XL Dancehall Mix) – 2:58
4. "Outrageous" (Junkie XL Tribal Mix) – 6:11
5. "Toxic" (Armand Van Helden Remix Edit) – 6:29
6. "Everytime" (Above & Beyond Club Mix) – 8:50
7. "Everytime" (Scumfrog Haunted Dub) – 8:23
- 12" vinyl (Remixes)
1. "Outrageous" (Murk Space Miami Mix) – 6:48
2. "Outrageous" (R. Kelly Remix) – 3:24
3. "Outrageous" (Junkie XL's Dancehall Mix) – 3:00
4. "Outrageous" (Josh Harris Mixshow) – 5:55
5. "Outrageous" (Junkie XL's Tribal Mix) – 6:12

== Credits and personnel ==
Credits adapted from the liner notes of In the Zone.

Recording

- Recorded at The Chocolate Factory, Chicago, Illinois
- Vocals recorded at Battery Studios Studios, New York City
- Mixed at MixStar Studios, Virginia Beach, Virginia

Personnel

- Britney Spears – lead vocals, background vocals
- R. Kelly – songwriting, production, co-mixing, background vocals, guest vocals
- Ian Mereness – recording, programming
- Abel Garibaldi – recording, programming
- Andy Gallas – recording
- Brian "B-Luv" Thomas – recording, digital editing
- John Hanes – digital editing
- Trixster – vocal arrangements and editing
- Serban Ghenea – mixing
- Penelope Magnet – production, vocal arrangements and editing, background vocals
- Donnie Lyle – guitars
- Kendall Nesbitt - keyboards
- Roxanne Estrada – background vocals
- Jason Mlodzinski - engineering assistant
- Nathan Wheeler - engineering assistant
- Rich Tapper - engineering assistant
- Steve Bearsley - engineering assistant
- Tim Roberts - engineering assistant

== Charts ==
=== Weekly charts ===
Chart (2004)	Peak position
CIS Airplay (TopHit)	179
CIS Airplay (TopHit) Josh Harris mixshow	74
Japan (Oricon)	31
Romania (Romanian Top 100)	71
US Billboard Hot 100	79
US Dance Club Songs (Billboard) Remixes	27
US Pop Airplay (Billboard)	23

2025 weekly chart performance for "Outrageous"
Chart (2025)	Peak position
Russia Streaming (TopHit)	100

=== Monthly charts ===
2025 monthly chart performance for "Outrageous"
Chart (2025)	Peak position
Russia Streaming (TopHit)	97

== Release history ==
Release dates and formats for "Outrageous"
Region	Date	Format(s)	Label	Ref.
United States	July 13, 2004	12-inch vinyl	Jive	
United States	July 20, 2004	Contemporary hit radio; rhythmic contemporary radio	Jive	
Japan	August 25, 2004	Maxi CD	Sony BMG	
