= The Onyx Hotel Tour =

2004 concert tour by Britney Spears

- Tour by Britney Spears
- Promotional poster for the tour
- Location: Europe; North America
- Associated album: In the Zone
- Start date: March 2, 2004
- End date: June 6, 2004
- Legs: 2
- No. of shows: 54
- Supporting acts: JC Chasez; Kelis; Skye Sweetnam; Wicked Wisdom
- Attendance: 601,040
- Box office: US$34 million (Note: US$57.95 million in 2025 dollars.)

Britney Spears concert chronology
- Dream Within a Dream Tour (2001–2002); The Onyx Hotel Tour (2004); The M+M's Tour (2007)

The Onyx Hotel Tour was the fifth concert tour by American entertainer Britney Spears. It showcased her fourth studio album, In the Zone (2003), and visited North America and Europe. A tour to promote the album was announced in December 2003. Its original name was the In the Zone Tour, but Spears was sued for trademark infringement and banned from using the name. Spears felt inspired to create a show with a hotel theme which she later mixed with the concept of an onyx stone. The stage, inspired by Broadway musicals, was less elaborate than her previous tours. The setlist was composed mostly by songs from In the Zone as well as some of her past songs reworked with different elements of jazz, blues, and Latin percussion. Tour promoter Clear Channel Entertainment marketed the tour to a more adult audience than her previous shows, while sponsor MTV promoted the tour heavily on TV shows and the network's website.

The tour was divided into seven segments: Check-In, Mystic Lounge, Mystic Garden, The Onyx Zone, Security Cameras, Club, and the encore. Check-In displayed performances with dance and advanced in the hotel theme. Mystic Lounge featured an homage to Cabaret and other musicals, while remixing some of Spears's early hits. Mystic Garden displayed a jungle-inspired stage. The Onyx Zone displayed a ballad performance with acrobats. Security Cameras was the raciest part of the show, with Spears and her dancers emulating different sexual practices. Club displayed a performance with urban influences. The encore consisted of a system malfunction interlude and Spears performed wearing a red ensemble. The tour received generally favourable reviews from contemporary critics, who praised it for being an entertaining show while criticizing it for looking "more [like] a spectacle than an actual concert".

The Onyx Hotel Tour was commercially successful. According to Billboard, the 25 shows in North America grossed $18.9 million with 300,460 tickets and $34,054,960 with 601,040 tickets sold in 52 of 54 shows worldwide. According to Pollstar, the North American dates for the Onyx Hotel Tour sold 298,930 tickets in 2004. On June 6, 2004, Spears performed for 25,367 fans at RDS Arena in Dublin with a $1,359,648 gross. The four nights at Wembley Arena in London grossed $2,179,820 with 41,823 tickets sold. In March, Spears suffered a knee injury onstage which forced her to reschedule two shows. In June, Spears fell and hurt her knee again during a music video shoot. She underwent arthroscopic surgery and the remainder of the tour was canceled. In 2005, Spears sued her insurance companies for denying her a reimbursement for the cancellation. Showtime broadcast live the March 28, 2004 show at the American Airlines Arena, in a special titled Britney Spears Live from Miami. Backstage footage was included in the reality show Britney and Kevin: Chaotic.

== Background ==
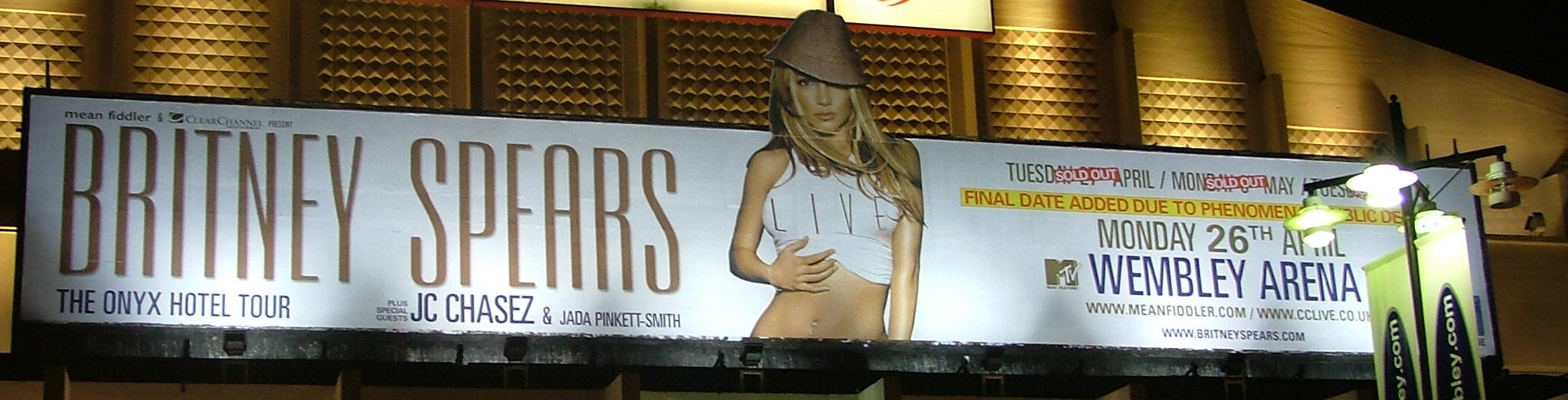
Promotional ad for the Wembley Arena stop of the tour

On December 2, 2003, Spears announced through her official website US concerts to support her fourth studio album, In the Zone (2003). The tour would kick off on March 2 in San Diego, California, at iPayOne Center. However, Spears released a statement saying, "I'm especially looking forward to bringing my tour to new markets and performing in front of fans that may not have had the opportunity to see any of my previous tours." On January 12, 2004, four dates were announced in Glasgow, Manchester, London and Birmingham, her first UK dates in four years. After the beginning of the North American leg, Spears announced a summer leg in the United States in June as well as a European leg starting on April 27 in London and ending on June 5 at Rock in Rio Lisboa. It was also rumored to visit Latin America and Asia later in the year. The Onyx Hotel Tour was originally going to be called In the Zone Tour. On February 17, 2004, a San Diego clothing manufacturer of the same name sued Spears for $10 million and banned her from using the trademark. On May 17, 2004, a hotel named Onyx Hotel opened in Boston, Massachusetts. Kimpton Hotels & Restaurant Group had come up with the name two years before the tour was developed. Spears and the Kimpton group decided to promote the hotel by featuring a room named The Britney Spears Foundation Room. It was designed by Spears's mother, Lynne, reflecting Spears's personality and taste. The room opened six weeks later and a portion of the fee was destined to the Britney Spears Foundation.

== Development ==
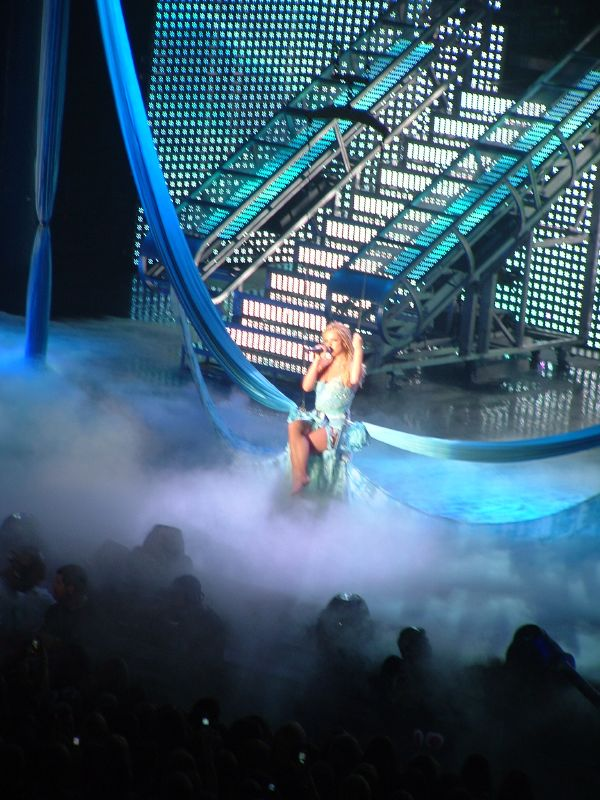
The performance of "Shadow"

The show was majorly inspired by Broadway musicals, primarily focused on Grand Hotel, which was directed by Tommy Tune and portrayed a day in the life of the Berlin Grand Hotel in 1928. Spears said the hotel theme was inspired by having traveled so much, and was merged with the onyx stone concept. The tour was described as a "unique, mysterious hotel powered by an onyx stone, where guests who enter shine their own light into the gemstone and make their fantasies come to life. It's a vibrant, whimsical place where wondrous dreams are realized, and the darkest of secrets are revealed". Spears also stated about the tour,

"I would love my audience to walk out of the auditorium feeling like they had the most magical experience of their life. The onyx stone is kind of symbolic of what guides me in my life, like there's a bigger picture in everything, and there's something that guides you where you need to go, from point A to point B".

Kevin Tancharoen was chosen as the tour director. He said about the development of the tour, "Coming from a movie lovers' background, I wanted to make it seem like a film. A little Joel Schumacher meets Tim Burton". He further explained that the onyx stone symbolized untapped desire. The stage was less elaborate than her previous tour, Dream Within a Dream Tour, with no runway extended towards the audience, in order to keep the show faithful to the New York theatre theme. There were three video screens above the stage. Also present were several LED columned-shaped video screens in the stage. The setlist was mostly composed from songs from In the Zone ("Early Mornin'" and "Brave New Girl" being the only songs of the album to not be on the tour). Other songs included were "Boys", "I'm a Slave 4 U" and "Overprotected" from Britney (2001). Also included were three of her early hits, "...Baby One More Time", "(You Drive Me) Crazy" and "Oops!... I Did It Again", reworked with elements of jazz and blues. The promotional photos for the tour were by Markus Klinko and Indrani. Tour promoter Clear Channel Entertainment marketed the tour to an entirely different demographic than her previous tours, changing from families and children to a more adult audience. The show was also targeted to the gay market. Promotional campaigns included were animated e-mails targeted to two million people who fitted the audience description. The tour was also advertised in several radio stations and TV shows for those audiences, such as The O.C. MTV was chosen as the tour sponsor. The sponsorship was extended to advertisements in the tickets and interactive promotions in MTV.com, such as exclusive downloads, streaming video and ticket and merchandise auctions benefiting the Britney Spears Foundation. Three episodes of TRL were dedicated to a behind-the-scenes special. Vice president of music marketing and promotion Joe Armenia talked about the sponsorship,

"There are not that many artists that appeal to every territory with an MTV channel, but Britney Spears is one of the select few. We have been waiting for the opportunity to make a global splash, and the Britney tour is it. For the better part of the rest of the year, we’ll be on the road with Britney. This is more support than we’ve ever given an artist in the U.S., let alone all over the world. We love the association with Britney; she has always been a core part of this channel and our fans love Britney".

== Concert synopsis ==
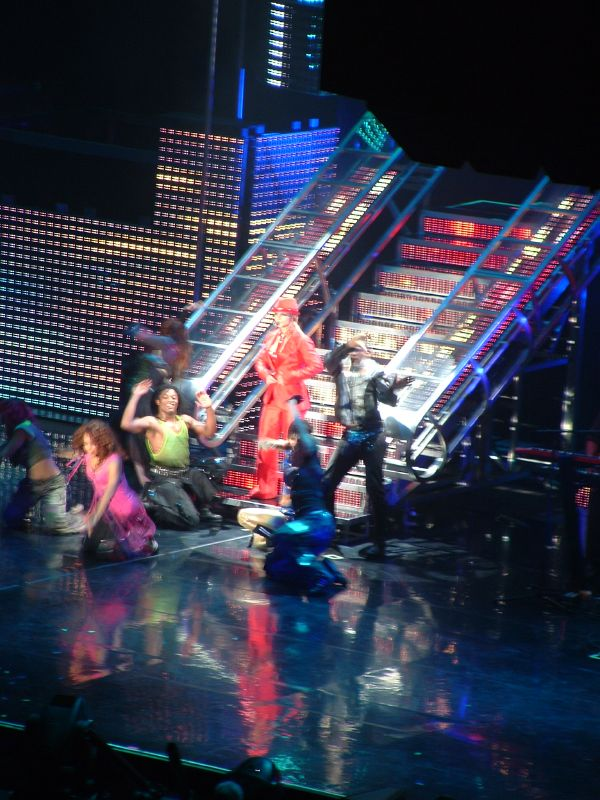
The encore performance of "Me Against the Music"

The show began with a skit where a flamboyant master of ceremonies welcomed spectators to the Onyx Hotel. After this, he took an onyx and threw into the video screens, causing a virtual chandelier to fall into the floor. Spears briefly appeared in the screens, as her dancers descended to the stage. She entered standing on top of a small bus dressed in a black catsuit, where she performed "Toxic". She descended to the stage for the breakdown and then performed "Overprotected". She took a break to talk to the audience, before going into "Boys", which featured the male dancers pushing her while she was standing in luggage carts. "Showdown" featured rainbow-colored lighting effects and was the last song of the first act. A video interlude followed featuring Spears and her friends outside a club. While she was leaving, she noticed a woman (played by Jada Pinkett Smith) dressed in 1930s fashion. She followed her and the woman asked Spears to enter the "Mystic Lounge". Spears reappeared wearing a frilly pink corset to perform "...Baby One More Time". She performed "Oops!... I Did It Again" with a vintage microphone and joined by her background singers. Spears and her dancers performed "(You Drive Me) Crazy", which contained elements of Latin percussion. After this, she talked to the audience and usually referenced her wedding with childhood friend Jason Alexander. She also introduced her band before leaving the stage.

In the next section, there was a video interlude of Spears wearing a flowered-themed dress and entering the "Mystic Garden". As the video ended, she appeared on-stage sitting at a leaf-covered piano. She talked to the audience before performing "Everytime". Her dancers joined her to perform "The Hook Up" and a jungle inspired mix of "I'm a Slave 4 U". The show continued with another video interlude featuring a spoof of paranormal-themed shows, "The Onyx Zone", with the master of ceremonies doing a Rod Serling impression and introducing "The Shadow Room". Spears reappeared sitting on a swing to perform "Shadow". During the performance, Spears was lifted into the air above an M-shaped blue ribbon, with performers twirling in the fabric. The performance ended with Spears leaving the stage while the dancers performed to a ballet interlude in flesh colored costumes. The next section began with a video projection of two guards watching Spears in her room through security cameras. Spears appeared on a smaller stage wearing a white robe and performed "Touch of My Hand" in a transparent bathtub. During the performance, she took the robe off to reveal a nude body suit with crystals that resembled her "Toxic" music video outfit. She left the stage briefly to a wardrobe change and reappeared on the mini platform where she descended to the main stage on a pole, wearing pink lingerie and performed "Breathe on Me" on a bed with one of her male dancers. She then put on a white trench coat and performed "Outrageous", the last song of the act.

In the next act, Spears and her dancers wore street clothes and performed "(I Got That) Boom Boom". After this, she introduced her band and dancers and left the stage. The encore began with a system malfunction where a female voice counted down as the screens sketched Spears' outline, which then rose to reveal Spears at the top of a staircase. After this, "Me Against the Music" (Rishi Rich's Desi Kulcha Remix) began and Spears appeared on stage wearing a red ensemble. The show ended with Spears and her dancers on the staircase where the screen is lowered and Spears made her exit as a shower of confetti was shot towards the audience.

== Reception ==
=== Critical response ===
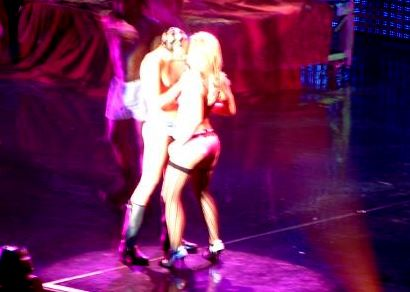
Spears on the right, kissing Leo Moctezuma, one of her male dancers, during the performance of "Breathe on Me"

The tour received mixed to positive reviews from critics. Gene Stout of the Seattle Post-Intelligencer called it a "throbbing, special-effects extravaganza". Aline Mendelsohn of The Orlando Sentinel noted influence from Janet Jackson in the show's choreography and suggestive themes, which had attracted many headlines due to the "heightened sensitivity of the post-Janet Jackson era." MTV UK highlighted the comparisons with early Madonna tours such as The Girlie Show and added that "[the show] is a theatrical extravaganza, complete with camp compere, sexy dancers, glitzy costumes and extravagant set pieces and its all fabulously raunchy". Bill Dean of The Ledger reported that the tour was "big sloppy and sex-filled". He also added, "Her presence remains captivating. [...] Perhaps even subsconsciously, the Onyx tour's most significant role may be foretelling a future in Broadway or film musicals". Neil Strauss of The New York Times claimed "her show was more a theater-and-dance spectacle than an actual concert, with the staging equal parts Cirque de Soleil [sic] and the redeveloped Times Square. [...] At times the show seemed more like a Las Vegas tribute to Ms. Spears than a concert by Ms. Spears herself".

Chris Willman of Entertainment Weekly believed that "In Britney, Paul Verhoeven's fantastic notion of the showgirl as superstar has become incarnate. But every showgirl needs a show. The Onyx Hotel tour hardly counts as one, with its arbitrary mishmash of Madonna-esque sex-bomb skits and Cirque du Soleil surrealism". The Seattle Times's Pamela Sitt said it "was high on spectacle and low on substance, veering crazily from burlesque to fairy tale to peep show". Doug Elfman of the Las Vegas Review-Journal stated that the tour "is an unfocused bore of false sexuality, horrible songs, trite choreography, unfocused themes and less ambition than a house cat that sits around licking itself all day". Darryl Morden of msnbc.com commented, "at times it was entertaining but overall came off as a variation on the same show she's been doing for several years".

=== Commercial performance ===
Tickets sold slower than her previous tours. This was attributed to the change in audience, since her new demographic tended to be "typically a last second ticket purchaser". A month before the tour began, seven dates were already sold out, including the Fresno and Toronto shows. Tour merchandise grossed $4 million on the North American leg alone, with an average of between $150,000 and $170,000 per night. This made Spears the highest-grossing merchandise female artist since she began touring in 1999, with a total gross of more than $30 million. On July 16, 2004, the tour was listed as the eight highest-grossing tour of the first semester of 2004, grossing $19 million. The tour ended up grossing $34 million.

== Moline injury ==
On March 18, 2004, during the Moline, Illinois show at The MARK of the Quad Cities, Spears fell during the performance of "(I Got That) Boom Boom" and injured her knee. She left the stage and returned shortly after wearing a white robe, apologizing to the audience for not being able to deliver the encore performance. A physician examined Spears and indicated that it was not related to a previous knee injury in 1999 during a dance rehearsal. The Rosemont, Illinois show at Allstate Arena, scheduled for March 19, was cancelled. Spears's label Jive Records asked fans to hold on to their tickets until further notice. The Flint Journal reported that the Auburn Hills, Michigan show at The Palace of Auburn Hills was also cancelled. Both shows were rescheduled to the end of the leg in April.

== Cancellation and lawsuit ==
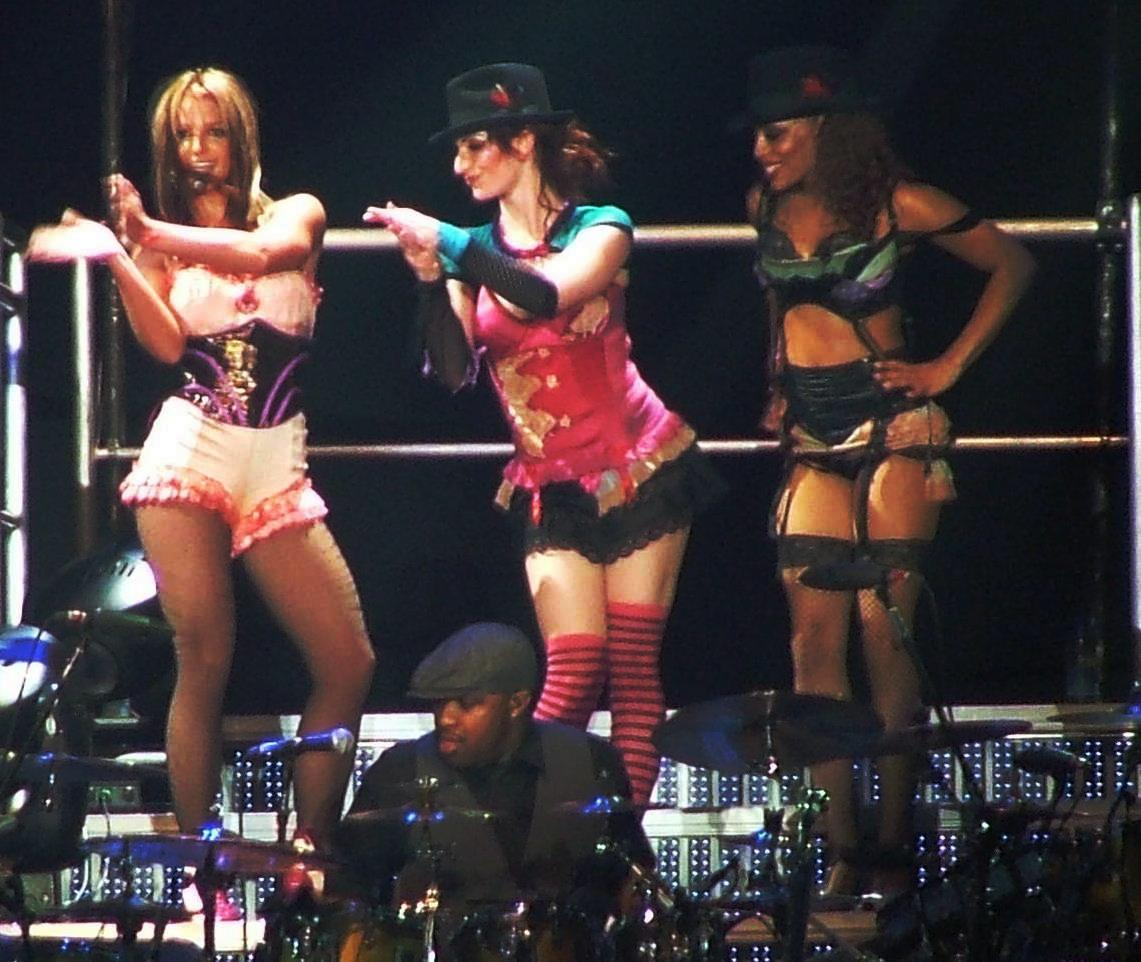
Spears and her dancers introducing her band in London

On June 8, 2004, Spears was shooting the music video for "Outrageous" in Manhattan, when she fell and injured her left knee. She was taken immediately to a local hospital, where doctors performed an MRI scan and found floating cartilage. The following day, Spears underwent arthroscopic surgery. She was forced to remain six weeks with a thigh brace, followed by eight to twelve weeks of rehabilitation, which caused any future concerts to be canceled. Jive Records issued a statement saying Spears planned to revisit the cities in the future. On February 4, 2005, Spears filed suit in New York State Supreme Court against eight insurance companies that denied her a reimbursement of $9.8 million. The insurers refused because they claimed Spears did not fully inform them of a previous 1999 knee injury in the insurance form. Attorney Jonathan Stoler who defended Spears on the case said,

"These are the same insurers who had provided her with policies on [several] tours and they had cleared her and were aware of the previous injury. The alleged omission related to a question whereby Ms. Spears was asked if in the past five years she had had any surgery. Ms. Spears, in all prior circumstances, had indicated she had, but at the time she was going through this application she did answer 'no.' It had not been a full five years, but four years and eleven months since the surgery [in 1999] and even if she had answered in the affirmative, our contention is that it makes no difference".

== Broadcast and recordings ==
On January 12, 2004, it was announced that Showtime would broadcast live the Miami show at the American Airlines Arena on March 28, in a special titled Britney Spears Live from Miami. It was directed by Hamish Hamilton. A concert promotional video and pictures were shot, in which Spears donned 1920s and 1930s hairstyles. She also wore a long black Roberto Cavalli dress, which was auctioned on eBay; proceeds went to the Britney Spears Foundation. On April 13, 2004, it was reported by MTV that Spears was planning a reality show titled "OnTourage" to document the backstage of the European leg, in a similar way to Madonna's Madonna: Truth or Dare. The show was reworked into the reality show Britney and Kevin: Chaotic. The concert for Rock in Rio Lisboa festival in Lisbon, Portugal, was broadcast live on June 5, 2004.

== Opening acts ==
- Kelis (North America) (select venues)
- Skye Sweetnam (Europe & North America) (select venues)
- JC Chasez (Europe) (select venues)
- Wicked Wisdom (Europe) (select venues)

== Set list ==
The following set list is obtained from the March 3, 2004 concert in Glendale, Arizona. It is not intended to represent all shows throughout the tour.

1. "Check In" (video intro)
2. "Toxic"
3. "Overprotected" (The Darkchild Remix)
4. "Boys" (The Co-Ed Remix)
5. "Showdown"
6. "Mystic Lounge" (video interlude)
7. "...Baby One More Time"
8. "Oops!... I Did It Again"
9. "(You Drive Me) Crazy"
10. "Mystic Garden" (video interlude)
11. "Everytime"
12. "The Hook Up"
13. "I'm a Slave 4 U"
14. "The Onyx Zone" (video interlude)
15. "Shadow"
16. "Security Cameras" (video interlude)
17. "Touch of My Hand"
18. "Breathe on Me"
19. "Outrageous"
20. "Club" (video interlude)
21. "(I Got That) Boom Boom"

Encore

22. "Check Out" (video interlude)
23. "Me Against the Music" (Rishi Rich's Desi Kulcha Remix)

Notes

- "Oops!... I Did It Again" and "Touch of My Hand" were not performed during the Lisbon concert.

== Tour dates ==
List of 2004 concerts, showing date, city, country, venue, tickets sold, number of available tickets and amount of gross revenue
Date (2004)	City	Country	Venue	Attendance	Revenue
March 2	San Diego	United States	San Diego Sports Arena	11,578 / 14,391	$666,015
March 3	Glendale	United States	Glendale Arena	13,143 / 13,718	$786,473
March 5	Fresno	United States	Save Mart Center	12,710 / 12,710	$778,577
March 6	Las Vegas	United States	MGM Grand Garden Arena	13,297 / 13,297	$1,075,105
March 8	Los Angeles	United States	Staples Center	15,059 / 15,171	$1,060,057
March 9	Oakland	United States	The Arena in Oakland	11,659 / 11,659	$823,963
March 11	Portland	United States	Rose Garden	7,781 / 11,562	$509,675
March 12	Seattle	United States	KeyArena	10,107 / 11,085	$650,208
March 15	Denver	United States	Pepsi Center	11,439 / 15,700	$639,682
March 17	Omaha	United States	Qwest Center Omaha	11,871 / 13,567	$626,871
March 18	Moline	United States	iWireless Center	8,697 / 10,463	$516,694
March 23	Atlanta	United States	Philips Arena	12,456 / 14,144	$793,814
March 24	Columbia	United States	Colonial Center	12,737 / 12,737	$715,683
March 25	Jacksonville	United States	Jacksonville Veterans Memorial Arena	11,227 / 11,227	$704,961
March 28	Miami	United States	American Airlines Arena	12,880 / 12,880	$826,543
March 29	Orlando	United States	TD Waterhouse Centre	10,189 / 10,189	$658,295
March 31	Philadelphia	United States	Wachovia Center	15,400 / 15,400	$1,002,316
April 3	Toronto	Canada	Air Canada Centre	15,469 / 16,143	$993,010
April 4	Montreal	Canada	Bell Centre	12,942 / 12,942	$857,003
April 6	Manchester	United States	Verizon Wireless Arena	9,141 / 9,270	$602,643
April 8	Providence	United States	Dunkin Donuts Center	10,628 / 10,762	$668,506
April 9	Trenton	United States	Sovereign Bank Arena	7,411 / 7,411	$528,784
April 10	East Rutherford	United States	Continental Airlines Arena	17,000 / 17,219	$959,306
April 13	Rosemont	United States	Allstate Arena	13,383 / 14,882	$866,678
April 14	Auburn Hills	United States	The Palace of Auburn Hills	13,059 / 13,998	$730,045
April 26	London	England	Wembley Arena	41,823 / 43,840 (Note: The score data is combined from the shows held at the Wembley Arena from April 26, 27 and May 3, 4, 2004, respectively.)	$2,179,820
April 27	London	England	Wembley Arena	41,823 / 43,840	$2,179,820
April 29	Glasgow	Scotland	Scottish Exhibition Hall 4	17,617 / 18,202	$898,390
April 30	Glasgow	Scotland	Scottish Exhibition Hall 4	17,617 / 18,202	$898,390
May 1	Manchester	England	Manchester Evening News Arena	14,272 / 14,446	$747,751
May 3	London	England	Wembley Arena	—	—
May 4	London	England	Wembley Arena	—	—
May 5	Birmingham	England	National Indoor Arena	12,404 / 12,404	$643,581
May 7	Rotterdam	Netherlands	Sportpaleis van Ahoy	9,500 / 9,500	$498,778
May 9	Copenhagen	Denmark	Forum Copenhagen	10,891 / 10,891	$443,974
May 10	Oslo	Norway	Oslo Spektrum	8,974 / 8,974	$491,138
May 11	Stockholm	Sweden	Stockholm Globe Arena	13,635 / 14,045	$681,891
May 14	Frankfurt	Germany	Festhalle Frankfurt	8,359 / 9,000	$393,628
May 15	Hamburg	Germany	Color Line Arena	8,215 / 9,000	$414,028
May 16	Berlin	Germany	Velodrom	12,000 / 12,000	$647,280
May 18	Lyon	France	Halle Tony Garnier	15,795 / 16,200	$659,884
May 19	Milan	Italy	FilaForum	9,548 / 9,548	$402,100
May 20	Zürich	Switzerland	Hallenstadion	13,000 / 13,000	$619,743
May 22	Vienna	Austria	Wiener Stadthalle	9,512 / 10,000	$528,476
May 23	Budapest	Hungary	Budapest Sports Arena	11,649 / 12,000	$659,538
May 25	Munich	Germany	Olympiahalle	8,832 / 9,500	$456,443
May 28	Oberhausen	Germany	König Pilsener Arena	9,284 / 10,000	$470,806
May 29	Ghent	Belgium	Flanders Expo	12,515 / 12,515	$585,927
May 30	Paris	France	Palais Omnisports de Paris-Bercy	16,448 / 16,500	$803,558
June 1	Belfast	Northern Ireland	Odyssey Arena	9,523 / 10,000	$750,832
June 2	Dublin	Ireland	Point Theatre	16,462 / 16,462	$880,504
June 3	Dublin	Ireland	Point Theatre	16,462 / 16,462	$880,504
June 5 (Note: The concert of June 5, 2004 at Parque da Bela Vista in Lisbon was part of Rock in Rio Lisboa.)	Lisbon	Portugal	Parque da Bela Vista	—N/a	—N/a
June 6	Dublin	Ireland	RDS Arena	25,367 / 27,500	$1,359,648
Total				616,888 / 648,054 (95.2%)	$35,258,625

== Cancelled shows ==
List of cancelled concerts, showing date, city, country, and venue
Date	City	Country	Venue	Reason
March 19, 2004	Rosemont	United States	Allstate Arena	Knee injury
March 21, 2004	Auburn Hills	United States	The Palace of Auburn Hills	Knee injury
April 1, 2004	Cleveland	United States	Gund Arena	Illness
May 26, 2004	Riesa	Germany	Erdgas Arena	Technical issues
June 22, 2004	Hartford	United States	ctnow.com Meadows Music Theatre	Knee injury
June 23, 2004	Mansfield	United States	Tweeter Performing Arts Center	Knee injury
June 25, 2004	Scranton	United States	Ford Pavilion	Knee injury
June 26, 2004	Darien	United States	Darien Lake Performing Arts Center	Knee injury
June 27, 2004	Toronto	Canada	Molson Amphitheatre	Knee injury
June 29, 2004	Cleveland	United States	Gund Arena	Knee injury
June 30, 2004	Noblesville	United States	Verizon Wireless Music Center	Knee injury
July 1, 2004	Milwaukee	United States	Marcus Amphitheater	Knee injury
July 3, 2004	Columbus	United States	Germain Amphitheater	Knee injury
July 4, 2004	Hershey	United States	Hersheypark Stadium	Knee injury
July 8, 2004	Wantagh	United States	Jones Beach Theater	Knee injury
July 9, 2004	Wantagh	United States	Jones Beach Theater	Knee injury
July 10, 2004	Bristow	United States	Nissan Pavilion	Knee injury
July 12, 2004	Camden	United States	Tweeter Center at the Waterfront	Knee injury
July 13, 2004	Holmdel	United States	PNC Bank Arts Center	Knee injury
July 14, 2004	Burgettstown	United States	Post-Gazette Pavilion	Knee injury
July 16, 2004	Minneapolis	United States	Target Center	Knee injury
July 17, 2004	Tinley Park	United States	Tweeter Center	Knee injury
July 19, 2004	Maryland Heights	United States	UMB Bank Pavilion	Knee injury
July 20, 2004	Nashville	United States	Starwood Amphitheatre	Knee injury
July 21, 2004	Atlanta	United States	HiFi Buys Amphitheatre	Knee injury
July 23, 2004	Atlantic City	United States	Borgata Event Center	Knee injury
July 24, 2004	Virginia Beach	United States	GTE Virginia Beach Amphitheater	Knee injury
July 25, 2004	Greensboro	United States	Greensboro Coliseum	Knee injury
July 28, 2004	Tampa	United States	Ford Amphitheatre	Knee injury
July 30, 2004	New Orleans	United States	New Orleans Arena	Knee injury
July 31, 2004	The Woodlands	United States	Cynthia Woods Mitchell Pavilion	Knee injury
August 2, 2004	Dallas	United States	Smirnoff Music Centre	Knee injury
August 3, 2004	Selma	United States	Verizon Wireless Amphitheater	Knee injury
August 5, 2004	Albuquerque	United States	ABQ Journal Pavilion	Knee injury
August 7, 2004	Irvine	United States	Verizon Wireless Amphitheatre	Knee injury
August 8, 2004	Concord	United States	Concord Pavilion	Knee injury
August 10, 2004	Wheatland	United States	Sleep Train Amphitheatre	Knee injury
August 11, 2004	Mountain View	United States	Shoreline Amphitheatre	Knee injury
August 13, 2004	Chula Vista	United States	Coors Amphitheatre	Knee injury
August 14, 2004	Las Vegas	United States	MGM Grand Garden Arena	Knee injury
August 15, 2004	Bakersfield	United States	Bakersfield Centennial Garden	Knee injury
