= Me Against the Music =

2003 single by Britney Spears

Single by Britney Spears featuring Madonna

from the album In the Zone
- Released: October 14, 2003
- Recorded: 2003
- Studio: Battery (New York City); Triangle Sound (Atlanta, Georgia); Olympic (London)
- Genre: Dance-pop; hip hop
- Length: 3:43
- Label: Jive
- Songwriters: Britney Spears; Madonna; Christopher "Tricky" Stewart; Thabiso "Tab" Nikhereanye; Penelope Magnet; Terius Nash; Gary O'Brien
- Producers: Christopher "Tricky" Stewart; Penelope Magnet

Britney Spears singles chronology
"Anticipating" (2002)	"Me Against the Music" (2003)	"Toxic" (2004)

Madonna singles chronology
"Hollywood" (2003)	"Me Against the Music" (2003)	"Nothing Fails" (2003)

Music video
- "Me Against the Music" on YouTube

"Me Against the Music" is a song by American singer Britney Spears from her fourth studio album, In the Zone (2003), featuring vocals by American singer Madonna. The singers co-wrote the song with Christopher "Tricky" Stewart, Thabiso "Tab" Nikhereanye, Penelope Magnet, Terius Nash and Gary O'Brien. It was released on October 14, 2003, by Jive Records, as the lead single of In the Zone. It became the first single to credit Madonna as a featured artist in her 20-year career. After bonding with Spears during a night in New York City, Stewart and Magnet started working on the song for her. During rehearsals for the 2003 MTV Video Music Awards, Spears played Madonna the track and asked her to collaborate.

"Me Against the Music" contains influences of dance-pop, hip hop and usage of funk guitars. Spears and Madonna trade lines during the verses, and Madonna sings the bridge. Lyrically, the song talks about battling the music and the pleasures of letting go on the dancefloor. The song received generally mixed reviews from music critics. Some felt it was a strong dance track of In the Zone, while others referred to it as lackluster and disappointing. The song was a commercial success, peaking atop of the charts in countries such as Australia, Denmark, Hungary, Ireland and Spain, as well as the European Hot 100 Singles. It also peaked at number two in Canada, Italy, Norway and the United Kingdom, and inside the top five in many other nations. The song won the "Hot Dance Single of the Year" accolade at the 2004 Billboard Music Awards.

The accompanying music video for "Me Against the Music" shows Spears and Madonna playing opposites in a nightclub. A cat-and-mouse chase ensues, and Spears finds Madonna in the end, only for the latter to disappear before they kiss. The video received positive reviews from critics, who noted it as symbolic of the sexual roles between the women. Spears has performed the song in a number of live appearances including the 2003 NFL Kickoff Live, Saturday Night Live, 2003 American Music Awards and TRL. She has also performed remixed versions with elements of bhangra music at The Onyx Hotel Tour (2004) and The Circus Starring Britney Spears (2009). Spears performed the song on her Las Vegas residency show Britney: Piece of Me. "Me Against the Music" has been remixed by Justice, while the music video was recreated by television series Glee and included an appearance by Spears.

== Background and writing ==
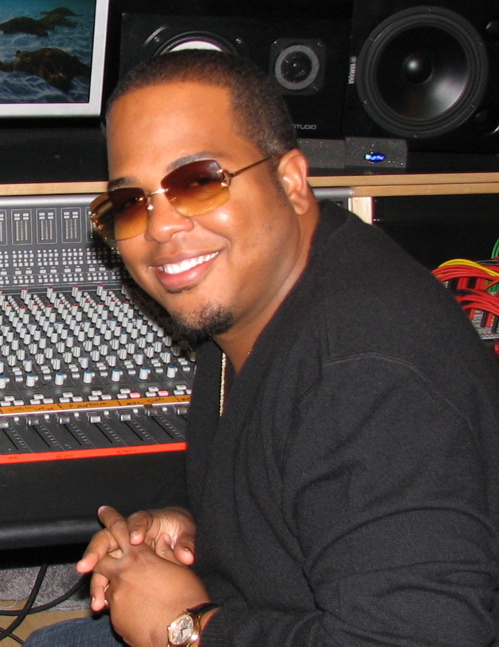
Christopher "Tricky" Stewart, co-wrote and produced "Me Against the Music".

American producers Christopher "Tricky" Stewart and Penelope Magnet, known collectively as RedZone Entertainment, presented Spears with the third song they had written and produced, "Pop Culture Whore". While her management liked the track, she rejected it, telling them the song "sucked". After bonding with Spears during a night in New York City to "get in her world", as Magnet explained, it was easier to "actually write and know what she would and wouldn't say, to know where her real vibe is". Stewart and Magnet began working on the first version of the song; Stewart came up with the track, while Magnet developed the melody on a piano and some of the lyrics. American producer The-Dream became involved after Stewart proposed him to work together on the track for Spears. He explained, "I was just getting into the business. I'm in Atlanta, driving home in a '92 Cadillac, and I get the call [...] I hung up and just screamed out joyous sounds." During the recording sessions, Stewart recalls that the studio's air-conditioning died for three days, but Spears "didn't complain or anything, and for me that shows she's where she is for a reason."

While rehearsing for their performance at the 2003 MTV Video Music Awards, Spears played a finished version of "Me Against the Music" to Madonna. After Madonna commented that she liked the track, Spears asked her to do the song with her. RedZone then handed "Me Against the Music" to Madonna, who arranged and recorded her vocal additions on her own, therefore making the song a duet. Spears, who has been a Madonna fan for years, was "beyond surprised" when she heard Madonna's verse. She said "I just asked her to do a little thing, but she really went there. She did a lot of stuff to it." Jive Records hoped "Outrageous" would be released as the first single from the album, but Spears pushed for "Me Against the Music". After she performed the song for the first time at the 2003 NFL Kickoff Live, Spears refused to answer if it was the first single from the album, but said that "there are some surprises that are going to come up in the song that I'm really excited about." On September 16, 2003, it was confirmed that "Me Against the Music" would be released as the first single from In the Zone.

== Composition and remixes ==
'Me Against the Music'
A 22-second sample of "Me Against the Music", featuring the first verse where Spears and Madonna trade lines.

"Me Against the Music" is a dance-pop and hip hop song with "funky guitar riffs" and "rapid-fire singing". The song features Madonna, but was constructed as a duet after she was added to the track. Spears and Madonna trade lines during the verses, and Madonna sings solo in the bridge. Stewart described the sound as "half-rapping, half-singing" and "beat-driven". According to the sheet music published at Musicnotes.com, "Me Against the Music" is set in a moderate dance beat, with a tempo of 120 beats per minute. Spears's vocal range span from the low-note of G_{2} to the high-note of B_{4}. Gavin Mueller of Stylus Magazine deemed Spears's vocals as "sexy and sultry" and compared them to those of Prince.

In the song, Spears and Madonna sing of the pleasures of letting go on the dancefloor, in lyrics such as "I'm up against the speaker / Trying to take on the music / It's like a competition". Spears explained the concept of the song as "basically about just going to a club and letting yourself go and battling with whoever is around you and battling against the music as well." Magnet continued, saying, "Like she was hearing the music and trying to out-dance the track or out-beat the drum or out-pluck the guitar. It's as if she's in the club, losing herself in the music." William Shaw of Blender stated Madonna's verse could be interpreted as her passing the baton to a new talent, as well as "a taunt from the old guard to the uptight youngster."

A number of remixes were commissioned by Jive Records to accompany the release. The Australian CD singles included remixes by artists such Peter Rauhofer, Rishi Rich, Passengerz and Terminalhead. The US CD single also contained remixes by Trak Starz, Gabriel & Dresden, Bloodshy & Avant and Kanye West. The Rishi Rich's Desi Kulcha Remix was later included in the track list of In the Zone. The remix removes the original melody of the song and adds a clattering backbeat and Punjabi shouts. Kelefa Sanneh of The New York Times called the remix "excellent", noting that it is "so frenetic you barely notice Ms. Spears and Madonna – it's odd to hear two such ubiquitous figures sounding so anonymous." There are two remixes released which do not feature Madonna; Bloodshy & Avant's Chix Mix was released on Spears's first EP accompanying the Britney Spears: In the Zone video, while the DragonMan Remix appears on the Dare for More Pepsi promotional CD, the New Divas 2004 compilation album and the Japan Tour edition of Glory. Both remixes feature a rap performed by the song's co-writer Penelope Magnet in place of Madonna's bridge. Spears had also contacted Outkast to remix "Me Against the Music" but the remix was not released.

== Critical response ==
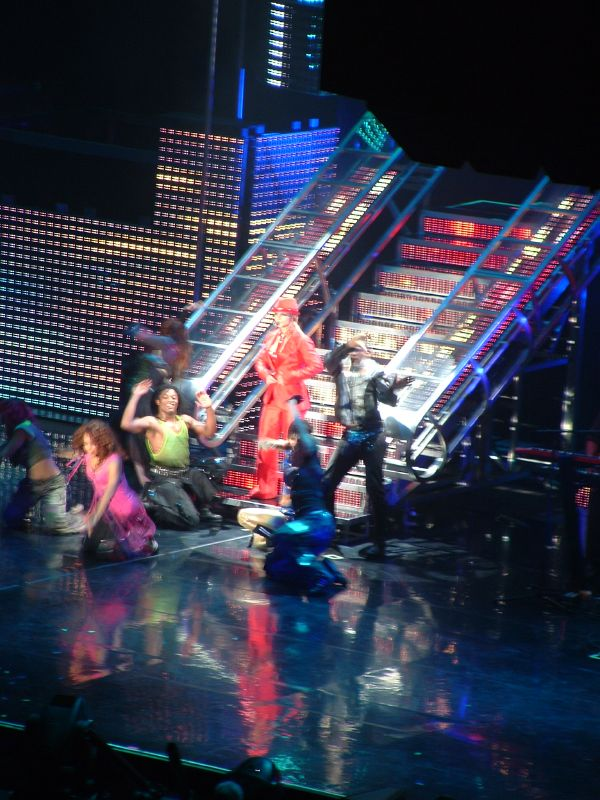
Spears performing "Me Against the Music" at The Onyx Hotel Tour

"Me Against the Music" received mixed reviews from critics upon release. Stephen Thomas Erlewine of AllMusic selected "Me Against the Music" as one of the 'track picks' from In the Zone. Caryn Ganz of Spin called the song "a fine specimen of Britney 4.0 – a fast-paced dance anthem, all grinding percussion shuttling through a traffic jam of synths." Dave De Sylvia of Sputnikmusic said that "Aside from numerous rather awful name-dropping passages and a disappointing chorus, the track is an ideal way to open the album. It's an up-tempo dance track with a big name attached; what else could you ask for?" Sal Cinquemani of Slant Magazine deemed it as "arguably one of Britney's finest moments and one of her mentor's worst". Nick Southall of Stylus Magazine said that "Madonna vamps it up (literally – her appearance here is not Sapphic but vampiric, the wizened old crone bleeding another period of forced longevity into her career like a cruenating corpse leaking plasma backwards) on 'Me Against The Music', but can't make it a bad tune." Gavin Mueller, also writing for Stylus Magazine, said that the single "benefits from a kinetic garage-inspired beat, even when a tepid Madonna threatens to spoil the fun."

Spence D. of IGN commented, "Initially catchy, it's ultimately forgettable other than it's the musical counterpart/fallout to/from the duo's lip lock publicity stunt on the 2003 MTV Music Video Awards." Jamie Gill of Yahoo! Music Radio stated that "Madonna's appearance on the brilliantly titled but deeply dreary 'Me Against The Music' was a postmodern prank designed to make all sane listeners think 'actually, American Life was pretty good, after all.'" While reviewing The Singles Collection, Mayer Nissim of Digital Spy said that "the only arguable weak link is the Madonna-featuring 'Me Against The Music', but in this context what once looked like a respectful passing of the baton now seems like an unconditional surrender of pop Queendom to its rightful heir." David Browne of Entertainment Weekly called "Me Against the Music" "the album's coy, overly busy single". Dorian Lynskey of The Guardian noted it as "the only duff track" of the album. Jon Pareles of Rolling Stone wrote, "Madonna shows up in the album's first song, 'Me Against the Music', as if endorsing Spears's foray into come-hither posing and club-land beats."

Larry Flick from The Advocate denounced the track as an "'Into the Groove' redux". He added that the song "propels the listener into Spears' collaborations with heavy-hitting producers. There's nary a hint of her pristine pop past on Kelly's hip-grinding 'Outrageous' or Perry's 'Girls & Boys'. Instead Spears swims through dark, often hip-hop hued waters with occasional forays into minor keyed electro dance terrain." Ali Fenwick of The Johns Hopkins News-Letter said, "Despite bringing out the big guns in a duet with Madonna, 'Me Against The Music' is not danceable, the measure of success in any pop tune." Linda McGee of RTÉ.ie commented that although much of the content of In the Zone is "catchy", "it is hard to see any potential singles impressing as much as 'Me Against The Music'." Kelefa Sanneh of The New York Times deemed it as "an odd, overstuffed track, not so much a song as a series of party chants". Mim Udovitch of Blender called it "lackluster". While ranking Madonna's singles in honor of her 60th birthday, The Guardian's Jude Rogers placed the song at number 71, writing that "[Madonna] is usually better when she's striding alone. This duet with Britney is all raunch and no solid roots". In 2023, Billboard's staff placed "Me Against the Music" at the 19th position on their 'The 100 Greatest Songs of 2003' list.

== Commercial performance ==
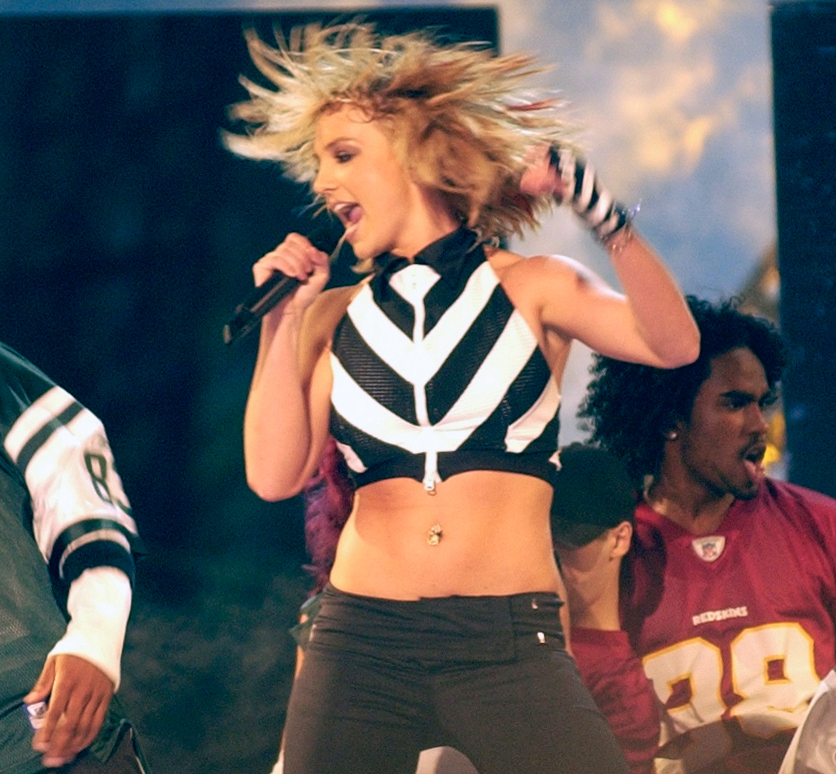
Spears performing "Me Against the Music" at the 2003 NFL Kickoff Live

On October 25, 2003, "Me Against the Music" debuted at number 50 on the Billboard Hot 100. It was Spears' 10th chart hit, as well as the first of her entries that she had co-written. "Me Against the Music" was incidentally Madonna's 50th chart entry, 20 years after her first appearance on the Hot 100 with "Holiday" the week of October 29, 1983. It was also the first song in chart history to credit Madonna as a featured artist, and her first chart entry not produced by her since "Love Don't Live Here Anymore" in 1996. On the issue dated November 29, 2003, "Me Against the Music" peaked at number 35. On the component charts, the song peaked at the top of Hot Dance Club Songs, becoming her first song to do so, and at number 11 on Pop Songs. It won the "Hot Dance Single of the Year" accolade at the 2004 Billboard Music Awards. In June 2012, Nielsen Soundscan reported that "Me Against the Music" sold 60,000 physical copies and 281,000 digital downloads in the US. "Me Against the Music" also peaked at number two on the Canadian Singles Chart.

In Australia, "Me Against the Music" debuted at number one on November 17, 2003, replacing Kylie Minogue's "Slow", and remained at the top for two weeks. It was certified platinum by the Australian Recording Industry Association (ARIA) for shipments of 70,000 units. On November 24, 2003, the song debuted at number 13 in New Zealand. "Me Against the Music" debuted in the United Kingdom at number two, on the week of November 16, 2003. It was blocked from ascending the top spot by Busted's "Crashed the Wedding". The song became Spears' most successful single since "I'm Not a Girl, Not Yet a Woman" in April 2002. According to the Official Charts Company, the song has sold 240,000 copies there. "Me Against the Music" also topped the Eurochart Hot 100 Singles chart for three consecutive weeks. The song topped the charts in Denmark, Hungary and Ireland; reached number two in Italy and Norway; the top five in Belgium (Flanders and Wallonia), Czech Republic, Finland, Sweden, Switzerland and the Netherlands. "Me Against the Music" also charted in the top 20 of Austria and France.

== Music video ==
=== Development ===
The music video for "Me Against the Music" was filmed over three days in October 2003, at Silvercup Studios in Long Island City, New York. It was directed by Paul Hunter, who revealed that the concept was setting Spears and Madonna apart, hence Spears wore a black outfit whereas Madonna sported a white suit. Kevin Tancharoen was the choreographer of the video. The vehicle used in the video, a Mazda RX-8, was autographed by Spears on the hood and auctioned off to benefit the Britney Spears Foundation. In 2009, Hunter talked to MTV News about the video, saying, "Madonna is an icon of an earlier generation, and then Britney of the newer generation. She was at her peak at that point [...] So it was a challenge to kind of bring both of the worlds together. I wanted it to be a bit of a cat-and-mouse sort of game and a little bit of a foreplay between Britney and Madonna and just sort of tease the audience."

=== Synopsis ===
The video starts with Spears parking a silver Mazda RX-8 and going into a New York nightclub. She enters a wooden room populated with 'cool kids' flaunting pink and purple hair while taking whiffs from an oxygen tank. Madonna, who is in a room filled with men smoking cigars, observes her from television monitors throughout the club. She wears a white trouser suit and carries a cane, signifying a position of moneyed power. Her suit is also notably fitted, especially in the waistcoat, revealing Madonna's body to be female and not masculine. Although the areas are separated by a wall, Spears and Madonna sense their presences through extrasensory perception and dance in synchronicity. Julie Andsager in Sex in consumer culture (2006) noted that the video hints at a same-sex relationship between the two.

This is followed with Spears performing a dance routine inside a blacklight paint graffiti room, and the two women dancing around a metal bedframe. Spears then begins chasing Madonna in a wooden-like maze, and the latter enters a room covered with fallen leaves and stands in a swing. Once Spears finds the room, Madonna is nowhere to be found. Throughout the video, Madonna gradually loses her symbolic power, paralleled by her disposing the cane and jacket, becoming less phallic and more noticeably female biologically and more feminine socially. Although it ultimately seems that Spears becomes the dominant figure, Madonna recovers her phallic power in the form of a cigar from an onlooking male. Spears appears in Madonna's room and throws her against the wall, and Madonna vanishes just as they are about to kiss. The video ends as Madonna's laugh is heard in the background.

=== Release and reception ===
The video premiered on television on Making the Video on October 21, 2003, at 23:00 EDT. Its online premiere was on Yahoo! Music. It was viewed more than two million times in its first five days. The video reached number one on the AOL Music Top Video chart in November 2003, with 3,356,007 million streams. In January 2004, the video topped the same chart again with 1,198,920 million streams. Jocelyn Vena of MTV said, "It was the changing of the guard – or at least the meeting of two of the most influential pop musicians of all time. [...] The superstars tantalize the audience (and each other) throughout the flirty video."

Julie Andsager stated the 'fantasy-fulfillment' strategy of Spears continued with the Madonna kiss and the "Me Against the Music" video, but added that "she has, perhaps, taken her sexuality to its extreme – for network television, at least – at the age of 21". Laurenz Volkmann said that it showcases an entire range of different female roles between 'older' and 'younger' sign systems. Author Judith Ann Peraino commented, "In 1963, Judy Garland presented Barbra Streisand as her protégée as songstress and gay icon; in 2003, Madonna instated Spears as her protégée in same-sex erotica and icon of polymorphous sexuality." The music video received a nomination for the Outstanding Achievement in Choreography at the 10th American Choreography Awards.

== Live performances and usage in media ==
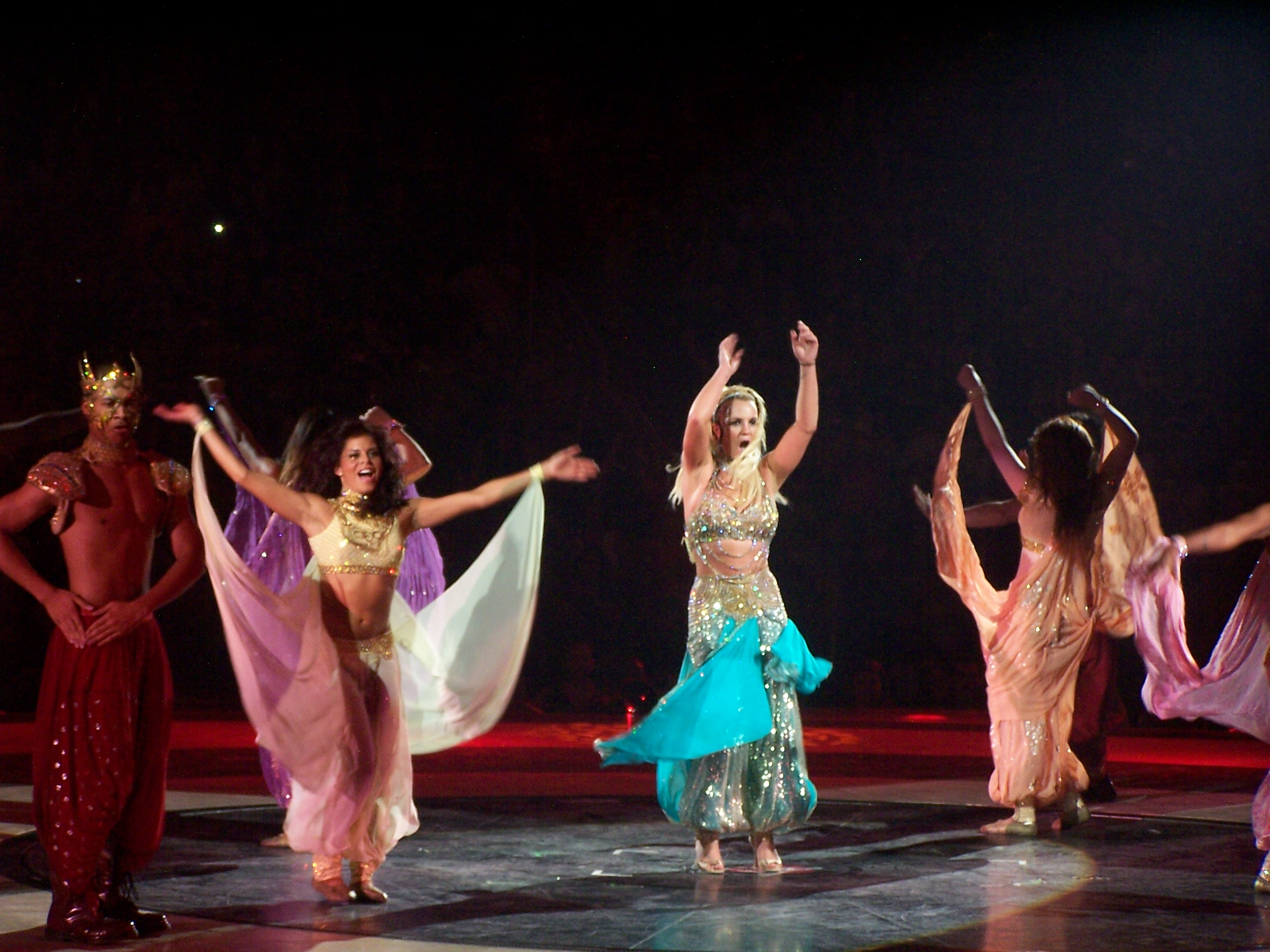
Spears performing "Me Against the Music" at the Circus Tour

Spears performed "Me Against the Music" for the first time at the 2003 NFL Kickoff Live on September 4, 2003, at the National Mall. She sported a shoulder-length blond wig and was dressed in black football pants, a black-and-white referee halter top and boots from Reebok. The performance segued into a medley of "...Baby One More Time" and "I'm a Slave 4 U", which included pyrotechnics. Her outfit was later auctioned off to benefit the Britney Spears Foundation. On September 14, 2003, Spears played a surprise concert at Rain Nightclub in the Palms Casino Resort, and "Me Against the Music" was the first song in the set. On October 18, 2003, the song was performed by Spears during the twenty-ninth season episode of Saturday Night Live hosted by Halle Berry. William Shaw of Blender stated, "Dancing and singing, Spears is in her element. She drips song-and-dance confidence. Within a few seconds, her shiny hat falls off, sending her blond hair everywhere, but Spears doesn't miss a step. When it comes to Madonna's verse, she can't help mouthing along to the words." Spears opened the 2003 American Music Awards telecast with a performance of "Me Against the Music". She floated down on a wire from the rafters in a gold overcoat, which she quickly shed to reveal a pink bustier, black vinyl thigh-high boots and black hot pants. She was accompanied by a troupe of brightly dressed faux punk rock dancers and a dizzying set that featured shooting flames, Vegas-style neon signs and a massive video screen.

It was also performed by Spears at Britney Spears: In the Zone, a concert special that aired in ABC on November 17, 2003. The following day, she performed on the American music show TRL at Times Square, wearing a fedora and her signature half-shirt. "Me Against the Music" was also performed on American late-night show The Tonight Show with Jay Leno and American morning show Live with Regis and Kelly on November 17 and 24, 2003. She performed the song as the headliner of the Jingle Ball on December 8, 2003, at the Staples Center. The Rishi Rich's Desi Kulcha Remix of "Me Against the Music" was performed as the encore number of 2004's The Onyx Hotel Tour. It began with a system malfunction where a female voice counted down as the screens sketched Spears's outline, which then rose to reveal her at the top of a staircase. Spears wore a red ensemble, an ended the performance on the staircase where the screen is lowered. She made her exit as a shower of confetti was shot towards the audience. "Me Against the Music" was also performed on 2009's The Circus Starring Britney Spears, in a Bollywood-inspired group dancing routine which included mudras. Spears wore green and gold harem pants ensemble. Jim Farber of Daily News said, "In a nod to trendiness, the shows included a mock-Bollywood dance sequence during 'Me Against The Music,' eagerly riding the 'Slumdog' gravy train." Spears performed the song during her Las Vegas residency show Britney: Piece of Me. During the performance, Spears is seen doing a dance routine with walls made of wood, which is a resemblance to the labyrinth scene from its music video.

== Cover versions, samples and parodies ==
- The music video was parodied during the 2003 French & Saunders Christmas special and on an episode of the American comedy show Mad TV.
- French electronic music duo Justice released a remix of "Me Against the Music" in 2005, and reproduced the coda of the song in their 2007 single "D.A.N.C.E.".
- A cover of the song by Helen is featured in the 2007 arcade game Dance Dance Revolution SuperNova 2, and in the 2008 arcade game Dance Dance Revolution X.
- The song is not only covered but the music video was recreated on the 2010 American series Glee episode "Britney/Brittany". The characters of Brittany Pierce (Heather Morris) and Santana Lopez (Naya Rivera) are put under general anesthesia during a trip to the dentist's office. They share an hallucination, in which Morris appears as Spears, whereas Rivera plays Madonna. Morris explained, "The 'Me Against the Music' montage, it's literally copied exactly from the video, the shots and looks, but the choreography is made so much more for a dancer – none of it is from the video. [...] It's insane." At the end of the number, Spears replaces Santana and pins Brittany against the wall, announcing to her that she is in a fantasy. Spears applauded the cover, pointing out that it "looks just like the original," and adding, "Santana does a great Madonna impression." The song charted at number ninety-three in Australia, fifty-four in Canada and fifty-six in the United States.

== Track listings ==
- European CD single
1. "Me Against the Music" (video mix) – 3:44
2. "Me Against the Music" (Rishi Rich's Desi Kulcha remix) – 4:33
- Australian CD maxi single 1 and Canadian CD maxi single
1. "Me Against the Music" (video mix) – 3:44
2. "Me Against the Music" (Peter Rauhofer radio mix) – 3:43
3. "Me Against the Music" (The Mad Brit Mixshow) – 5:55
- Australian CD maxi single 2
1. "Me Against the Music" (Rishi Rich's Desi Kulcha remix) – 4:33
2. "Me Against the Music" (Passengerz vs. the club mix) – 7:34
3. "Me Against the Music" (Terminalhead vocal mix) – 7:07
4. "Me Against the Music" (video mix instrumental) – 3:35
- European and Japanese CD maxi single and UK 12-inch vinyl
1. "Me Against the Music" (Video Mix) – 3:44
2. "Me Against the Music" (Rishi Rich's Desi Kulcha remix) – 4:33
3. "Me Against the Music" (Peter Rauhofer radio mix) – 3:43
4. "Me Against the Music" (The Mad Brit Mixshow) – 5:55
- US CD maxi single
1. "Me Against the Music" (video mix) – 3:44
2. "Me Against the Music" (The Trak Starz remix) – 3:31
3. "Me Against the Music" (Gabriel & Dresden club mix) – 8:51
4. "Me Against the Music" (Peter Rauhofer radio mix) – 3:43
5. "Me Against the Music" (The Mad Brit Mixshow) – 5:55
6. "Me Against the Music" (Bloodshy & Avant "Dubbie Style" remix) – 5:15
7. "Me Against the Music" (Kanye West remix) – 3:43
- European 3-track maxi single
1. "Me Against the Music" (The Trak Starz remix) – 3:31
2. "Me Against the Music" (Scott Storch remix) – 3:38
3. "Me Against the Music" (Kanye West remix) – 3:43
- 12-inch vinyl
1. "Me Against the Music" (Rishi Rich's Desi Kulcha remix) – 4:33
2. "Me Against the Music" (Rishi Rich's Desi Kulcha remix instrumental) – 4:33
3. "Me Against the Music" (video mix) – 3:47
4. "Me Against the Music" (video mix instrumental) – 3:47
- European 12-inch vinyl (remixes)
1. "Me Against the Music" (Peter Rauhofer's Electrohouse mix) – 8:17
2. "Me Against the Music" (Passengerz vs. the club mix) – 7:34
3. "Me Against the Music" (Gabriel & Dresden club mix) – 8:51
4. "Me Against the Music" (The Mad Brit Mixshow) – 5:55
- US 12-inch vinyl (remixes)
1. "Me Against the Music" (Peter Rauhofer's Electrohouse mix) – 8:17
2. "Me Against the Music" (The Mad Brit Mixshow) – 5:55
3. "Me Against the Music" (Gabriel & Dresden club mix) – 8:51
4. "Me Against the Music" (Rishi Rich's Punjabi club mix) – 5:34
5. "Me Against the Music" (Peter Rauhofer's Electrohouse dub) – 6:49
6. "Me Against the Music" (Passengerz vs. the club mix) – 7:34
7. "Me Against the Music" (Gabriel & Dresden dub) – 7:14
8. "Me Against the Music" (Terminalhead vocal mix) – 7:07

== Credits and personnel ==
Credits are adapted from the liner notes of In the Zone.

Recording

- Britney Spears' vocals recorded at Battery Studios, New York City; Triangle Sound Studios, Atlanta, Georgia
- Madonna's vocals recorded at Olympic Studios, London, England
- Mixed at MixStar Studios, Virginia Beach, Virginia, and at Olympic Studios, London, England

Personnel

- Britney Spears – lead vocals, background vocals, songwriting, arranging
- Madonna – lead vocals, songwriting
- Penelope Magnet – songwriting, co-production, background vocals, arranging
- C. "Tricky" Stewart – songwriting, arranging, programming, all other instruments
- Thabiso Nikhereanye – songwriting
- Terius Nash – songwriting
- Gary O'Brien – songwriting, guitar
- Trixster – producer
- Steve Lunt – A&R, arranging
- Brian "B-Luv" Thomas – recording, digital editing
- Mark "Spike" Stent – vocal recording, mixing
- Serban Ghenea – mixing
- John Hanes – digital editing
- P-Dub Walton – digital editing
- Courtney Copeland – background vocals
- Emma Roads – background vocals
- Roxanne Estrada – background vocals
- Charles McCrorey – engineering assistant
- David Treahearn – engineering assistant
- Rob Haggert – engineering assistant
- Tim Roberts – engineering assistant

== Charts ==
=== Weekly charts ===
Weekly chart performance
Chart (2003–2004)	Peak position
Australia (ARIA)	1
Australia Dance (ARIA)	1
Austria (Ö3 Austria Top 40)	4
Belgium (Ultratop 50 Flanders)	5
Belgium (Ultratop 50 Wallonia)	3
Canada (Nielsen SoundScan)	2
Croatia International Airplay (HRT)	1
Czech Republic (Rádio Top 100)	3
Denmark (Tracklisten)	1
European Hot 100 Singles (Billboard)	1
European Radio Top 50 (Billboard)	1
Finland (Suomen virallinen lista)	5
France (SNEP)	11
Germany (GfK)	5
Greece (IFPI)	1
Hungary (Single Top 40)	1
Ireland (IRMA)	1
Italy (FIMI)	2
Japan (Oricon)	9
Netherlands (Dutch Top 40)	6
Netherlands (Single Top 100)	5
New Zealand (Recorded Music NZ)	13
Norway (VG-lista)	2
Romania (Romanian Top 100)	1
Scottish Singles Sales (Official Charts)	2
Spain (PROMUSICAE)	1
Sweden (Sverigetopplistan)	1
Switzerland (Schweizer Hitparade)	4
UK Singles (Official Charts)	2
US Billboard Hot 100	35
US Dance Club Songs (Billboard)	1
US Dance Singles Sales (Billboard)	1
US Dance Airplay (Billboard)	9
US Pop Airplay (Billboard)	11

=== Year-end charts ===
Year-end chart performance
Chart (2003)	Position
Australia (ARIA)	48
Australia Dance (ARIA)	3
Belgium (Ultratop 50 Flanders)	85
Belgium (Ultratop 50 Wallonia)	81
Brazil (Crowley Broadcast Analysis)	67
Ireland (IRMA)	33
Italy (FIMI)	31
Netherlands (Dutch Top 40)	84
Netherlands (Single Top 100)	80
Sweden (Hitlistan)	68
Switzerland (Schweizer Hitparade)	62
UK Singles (OCC)	60
US Mainstream Top 40 (Billboard)	97

Year-end chart performance
Chart (2004)	Position
Australia (ARIA)	95
Australia Dance (ARIA)	10
Brazil (Crowley Broadcast Analysis)	88
US Dance Club Play (Billboard)	32
US Dance Singles Sales (Billboard)	1

== Certifications and sales ==
Certifications and sales
Region	Certification	Certified units/sales
Australia (ARIA)	Platinum	70,000^{^}
Norway (IFPI Norway)	Gold	5,000^{*}
United Kingdom (BPI)	Silver	240,000
United States (RIAA)	Gold	500,000^{‡}
^{*} Sales figures based on certification alone.^{^} Shipments figures based on certification alone.^{‡} Sales+streaming figures based on certification alone.

== Release history ==
Release dates and formats
Region	Date	Format(s)	Label	Ref.
United States	October 14, 2003	Contemporary hit radio; rhythmic contemporary radio	Jive	
United States	October 21, 2003	12-inch vinyl	Jive	
Japan	November 5, 2003	Maxi CD	Avex Trax	
Australia	November 10, 2003	Maxi CD	BMG	
France	November 10, 2003	Maxi CD	Virgin	
Germany	November 10, 2003	12-inch vinyl; maxi CD	BMG	
United Kingdom	November 10, 2003	12-inch vinyl; cassette; maxi CD	RCA	
France	November 25, 2003	CD	Virgin	
United States	December 9, 2003	Maxi CD	Jive	

== See also ==
- List of number-one singles of 2003 (Australia)
- List of number-one songs of the 2000s (Denmark)
- List of European number-one hits of 2003
- List of number-one singles of the 2010s (Hungary)
- List of number-one singles of 2003 (Ireland)
- List of number-one singles of 2003 (Spain)
- List of Billboard Hot Dance Music/Club Play number ones of 2003
- List of Billboard Hot Dance Club Play number ones of 2004
- List of most expensive music videos
