= List of awards and nominations received by Britney Spears =

Britney Spears awards and nominations
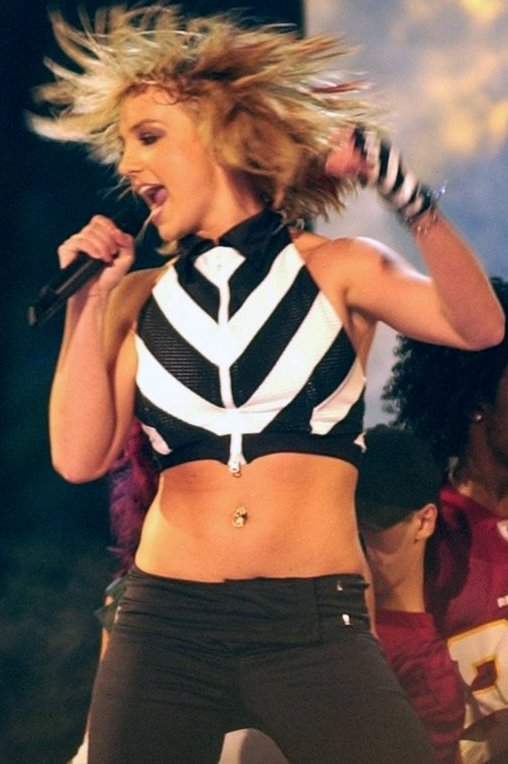
- Spears performing in 2003
Awards and nominations
Award	Wins	Nominations
American Music Awards	1	6
Barbie Awards	1	1
Best of Las Vegas Awards	10	10
Billboard Mid-Year Music Awards	7	10
Billboard Music Awards	9	22
Danish Grammy Awards	1	1
GLAAD Media Awards	1	1
Grammy Awards	1	8
MTV Video Music Awards	6	31
NRJ Music Awards	3	5
People's Choice Awards	7	23
Teen Choice Awards	12	49

Totals (Note: Certain award groups do not simply award one winner. They acknowledge several different recipients, have runners-up, and have third place. Since this is a specific recognition and is different from losing an award, runner-up mentions are considered wins in this award tally. For simplification and to avoid errors, each award in this list has been presumed to have had a prior nomination.)
- Wins: 411
- Nominations: 777

American entertainer Britney Spears has received numerous industry awards and honorary accolades. She was inducted into the Hollywood Walk of Fame at age 21, making her the youngest artist in the recording industry to be awarded a star. She has been nominated for eight Grammy Awards and six American Music Awards, winning one from each of these and she has won nine Billboard Music Awards from 22 nominations, including the Millennium Award in 2016.

Upon their release, Spears's first two studio albums, ...Baby One More Time (1999) and Oops!... I Did It Again (2000), achieved commercial success and made her the best-selling teenage artist of all time, according to Guinness World Records. Though both albums received mixed critical response, the former won a Billboard Music Award and a Teen Choice Award, while the latter won two Billboard Music Awards.

In 2001, Spears released her self-titled third studio album, Britney. The album earned two Grammy nominations—Best Pop Vocal Album and Best Female Pop Vocal Performance for "Overprotected". The following year, Spears made her feature film debut with a leading role in Crossroads (2002), which was a box office success. However, the film received negative reviews from film critics, and Spears won Worst Actress at the 23rd Golden Raspberry Awards and Worst Original Song for "I'm Not a Girl, Not Yet a Woman". Her fourth studio album, In the Zone (2003), included "Toxic", which won the Grammy Award for Best Dance Recording. (Note: "Toxic" also won an Ivor Novello Award and an ASCAP Pop Music Award. However, Spears was not credited as a songwriter. The song was written by Cathy Dennis, Christian Karlsson, Pontus Winnberg, and Henrik Jonback.)

In 2007, Spears released her fifth studio album, Blackout, for which she won Album of the Year at the MTV Europe Music Awards and International Album at the NRJ Music Awards. The album was added to the library and archives of the Rock and Roll Hall of Fame. The following year, she released her sixth album, Circus, which included the lead single "Womanizer". It won International Video of the Year at the 10th NRJ Music Awards. The song was also nominated for Best Dance Recording at the 52nd Annual Grammy Awards and Video of the Year at the 2009 MTV Video Music Awards. In 2009, she released the greatest hits album The Singles Collection, and the song "3" from the album debuted at number one on the Billboard Hot 100, making her the seventh female artist to achieve this milestone. In the same year, she was named the youngest female to have five number-one studio albums in the US by Guinness World Records.

At the 2011 MTV Video Music Awards, Spears was awarded the Michael Jackson Video Vanguard Award, becoming the third woman to win it. She also won Best Pop Video for "Till the World Ends", making her the only artist to receive this award three times. Spears previously held the record for most Teen Choice Awards with 11 wins before being surpassed by Taylor Swift in 2011. Spears was awarded the Icon Award by the Teen Choice Awards in 2015, Music Choice Awards in 2016, and Radio Disney Music Awards in 2017. She also received a Vanguard Award at the GLAAD Media Awards in 2018. In 2020, Rolling Stone named her debut single "...Baby One More Time" as the greatest debut single of all time, and listed Blackout at number 441 in their 500 Greatest Albums of All Time ranking.

== Awards and nominations ==
List of awards and nominations received by Britney Spears
Year	Award	Category	Nominee(s)	Result	Ref.
2009	4Music Video Honours	World's Greatest Popstar	Britney Spears	Nominated	
2011	4Music Video Honours	Best Video	"Till the World Ends"	Nominated	
2011	4Music Video Honours	Best Video	"I Wanna Go"	Nominated	
2000	APRA Music Awards	Most Performed Foreign Work	"...Baby One More Time"	Nominated	
2000	Amadeus Austrian Music Awards	International Newcomer of the Year	Britney Spears	Won	
2001	Amadeus Austrian Music Awards	International Solo Pop/Rock Artist	"Oops!... I Did It Again"	Nominated	
2000	American Music Awards	Favorite Pop/Rock New Artist	Britney Spears	Won	
2000	American Music Awards	Favorite Pop/Rock Female Artist	Britney Spears	Nominated	
2000	American Music Awards	Favorite Pop/Rock Album	...Baby One More Time	Nominated	
2001	American Music Awards	Favorite Pop/Rock Album	Oops!... I Did It Again	Nominated	
2001	American Music Awards	Artist of the Year	Britney Spears	Nominated	
2001	American Music Awards	Favorite Pop/Rock Female Artist	Britney Spears	Nominated	
2000	Artistdirect Awards	Favorite Turn-It-Up-Loud CD	Oops!... I Did It Again	Nominated	
2000	Artistdirect Awards	Favorite Female Artist	Britney Spears	Nominated	
2000	Artistdirect Awards	Most Talked About Artist	Britney Spears	Nominated	
2000	Artistdirect Awards	Sexiest Female	Britney Spears	Nominated	
2000	Artistdirect Awards	Best Official Site	Britney Spears	Nominated	
2003	BDS Awards	200,000 Spins	"Sometimes"	Won	
2004	BDS Awards	50,000 Spins	"Me Against the Music" (featuring Madonna)	Won	
2004	BDS Awards	50,000 Spins	"Toxic"	Won	
2004	BDS Awards	100,000 Spins	"Toxic"	Won	
2004	BDS Awards	200,000 Spins	"Toxic"	Won	
2004	BDS Awards	50,000 Spins	"Everytime"	Won	
2004	BDS Awards	100,000 Spins	"Everytime"	Won	
2010	BDS Awards	100,000 Spins	"3"	Won	
2010	BDS Awards	50,000 Spins	"3"	Won	
2011	BDS Awards	100,000 Spins	"Hold It Against Me"	Won	
2011	BDS Awards	200,000 Spins	"Till the World Ends"	Won	
2011	BDS Awards	200,000 Spins	"I Wanna Go"	Won	
2011	BDS Awards	300,000 Spins	"Womanizer"	Won	
2005	BMI Film & TV Awards (Note: The awards seek to recognise the world best composers and songwriters. However, Spears was not credited as a songwriter for "Sometimes", "(You Drive Me) Crazy", "Circus", "3", "Hold It Against Me", "Till the World Ends", and "I Wanna Go"—all of which won multiple times at the BMI Pop Awards & BMI London Awards in 2000, 2001, 2010, 2011, 2012, and 2013, respectively.)	Best Original Song	"Follow Me" (Note: "Follow Me" was recorded by Jamie Lynn Spears as the theme song for Zoey 101, however in this category the nomination is credited to the songwriters. The song was written and produced by Britney Spears herself.)	Won	
2008	BMI Film & TV Awards	Best Original Song	"Follow Me"	Won	
2008	Bambi Awards	Best International Pop Star	Britney Spears	Won	
2002	Barbie	Barbie Award	Britney Spears	Won	
2007	Basenotes Fragrance Awards	Best Celebrity Fragrance for Women of the Year	Curious	Won	
2007	Basenotes Fragrance Awards	Best Celebrity Fragrance for Women of the Year	Fantasy	Won	
2008	Basenotes Fragrance Awards	Best Celebrity Women's Fragrance	Fantasy	Won	
2009	Basenotes Fragrance Awards	Best Celebrity Women's Fragrance	Fantasy	Won	
2015	Best of Las Vegas Awards	Best Overall Show	Britney: Piece of Me	Gold	
2015	Best of Las Vegas Awards	Best Bachelorette Party	Britney Spears	Gold	
2016	Best of Las Vegas Awards	Best Singer/Musician (Note: Tied with Celine Dion.)	Britney Spears	Gold	
2016	Best of Las Vegas Awards	Best Resident Performer	Britney Spears	Gold	
2016	Best of Las Vegas Awards	Best Bachelorette Party	Britney Spears	Silver	
2016	Best of Las Vegas Awards	Best Banchelor Party	Britney Spears	Silver	
2017	Best of Las Vegas Awards	Best Bachelorette Party	Britney Spears	Gold	
2017	Best of Las Vegas Awards	Best Resident Performer	Britney Spears	Gold	
2017	Best of Las Vegas Awards	Best Bachelor Party	Britney Spears	Gold	
2017	Best of Las Vegas Awards	Best Production Show	Britney: Piece of Me	Gold	
2011	Billboard Mid-Year Music Awards	First-Half MVP	Britney Spears	Won	
2011	Billboard Mid-Year Music Awards	Best Dressed	Britney Spears	Nominated	
2011	Billboard Mid-Year Music Awards	Best Comeback	Britney Spears	Nominated	
2011	Billboard Mid-Year Music Awards	Best Song	"Hold It Against Me"	Won	
2011	Billboard Mid-Year Music Awards	Best Album	Femme Fatale	Won	
2011	Billboard Mid-Year Music Awards	Best Music Video	"I Wanna Go"	Won	
2011	Billboard Mid-Year Music Awards	Best Tour	Femme Fatale Tour	Won	
2012	Billboard Mid-Year Music Awards	Most Anticipated Event	The X Factor	Won	
2013	Billboard Mid-Year Music Awards	Most Anticipated Event	"Work Bitch"	Won	
2015	Billboard Mid-Year Music Awards	Most Buzzed-About Moment	"Pretty Girls" (with Iggy Azalea)	Nominated	
1999	Billboard Music Awards	Artist of the Year	Britney Spears	Nominated	
1999	Billboard Music Awards	Female Artist of the Year	Britney Spears	Won	
1999	Billboard Music Awards	Top New Artist	Britney Spears	Won	
1999	Billboard Music Awards	Top Billboard 200 Artist	Britney Spears	Nominated	
1999	Billboard Music Awards	Top Billboard Hot 100 Artist	Britney Spears	Won	
1999	Billboard Music Awards	Top Billboard 200 Album	...Baby One More Time	Nominated	
1999	Billboard Music Awards	Female Albums Artist of the Year	...Baby One More Time	Won	
1999	Billboard Music Awards	Female Singles Artist of the Year	...Baby One More Time	Won	
2000	Billboard Music Awards	Female Artist of the Year	Britney Spears	Nominated	
2000	Billboard Music Awards	Top Billboard 200 Artist	Britney Spears	Nominated	
2000	Billboard Music Awards	Albums Artist of the Year	Oops!... I Did It Again	Won	
2000	Billboard Music Awards	Top Billboard 200 Album	Oops!... I Did It Again	Nominated	
2000	Billboard Music Awards	Biggest One-Week Sales of an Album Ever by a Female Artist	Oops!... I Did It Again	Won	
2001	Billboard Music Awards	Female Albums Artist of the Year	Britney	Nominated	
2004	Billboard Music Awards	Top Female Artist	Britney Spears	Nominated	
2004	Billboard Music Awards	Top Billboard 200 Album	Britney Spears	Nominated	
2004	Billboard Music Awards	Mainstream Top 40 Artist of the Year	Britney Spears	Nominated	
2004	Billboard Music Awards	Top Hot 100 Artist	Britney Spears	Nominated	
2004	Billboard Music Awards	Top-Selling Dance Single of the Year	"Me Against the Music" (featuring Madonna)	Won	
2012	Billboard Music Awards	Top Dance/Electronic Song	"Till the World Ends"	Nominated	
2012	Billboard Music Awards	Top Dance Artist	Britney Spears	Nominated	
2016	Billboard Music Awards	Millennium Award	Britney Spears	Won	
2023	Billboard Music Awards	Top Dance/Electronic Song	"Hold Me Closer"	Nominated	
2002	Billboard Music Video Awards	Adult Contemporary: Best Clip of the Year	"Don't Let Me Be the Last to Know"	Nominated	
2009	Billboard Touring Awards	Top Touring Artist of the Decade	Britney Spears	Nominated	
2009	Billboard Touring Awards	Top Tour	The Circus Starring Britney Spears	Nominated	
2011	Billboard Touring Awards	Top Tour	Femme Fatale Tour	Nominated	
2009	Billboard Year-End Awards	Artist of the Year (Female)	Britney Spears	7th place	
2016	Bizarre Awards	Woman of the Year	Britney Spears	Won	
2000	Blockbuster Entertainment Awards	Favorite CD	...Baby One More Time	Nominated	
2000	Blockbuster Entertainment Awards	Favorite Female New Artist	...Baby One More Time	Nominated	
2001	Blockbuster Entertainment Awards	Favorite Female Pop Artist	Oops!... I Did It Again	Won	
2001	Blockbuster Entertainment Awards	Favorite Female Artist of the Year	Oops!... I Did It Again	Nominated	
2001	Blockbuster Entertainment Awards	Favorite CD	Oops!... I Did It Again	Nominated	
2009	Bravo A-List Awards	A-List Album	Circus	Won	
2009	Bravo A-List Awards	A-List Download	"Circus"	Won	
2009	Bravo A-List Awards	A-List Artist of the Year	Britney Spears	Won	
1999	Bravo Otto	Best Female Singer	Britney Spears	Gold	
2000	Bravo Otto	Best Female Singer	Britney Spears	Gold	
2001	Bravo Otto	Best Female Singer	Britney Spears	Bronze	
2008	Bravo Otto	Best Female Singer	Britney Spears	Silver	
2013	Bravo Otto	Super-BFFs	Britney Spears & Miley Cyrus	Nominated	
2021	BreakOut Awards	Breakout of the Year	#FreeBritney movement	Won	
2018	BreakTudo Awards	Best Summer Tour Artist	Britney Spears	Nominated	
2023	BreakTudo Awards	International Collaboration of the Year	"Hold Me Closer"	Nominated	
2024	British Book Awards	Non-fiction: Narrative Book of the Year	The Woman in Me	Shortlisted	
2000	Brit Awards	Best International Female Solo Artist	Britney Spears	Nominated	
2000	Brit Awards	International Breakthrough Act	Britney Spears	Nominated	
2001	Brit Awards	Best International Female Solo Artist	Britney Spears	Nominated	
2001	Brit Awards	Best Pop Act	Britney Spears	Nominated	
2000	CD:UK	Best Singer	Britney Spears	Won	
1999	CDDB Silicon CD Award	Most Played Single in the World	"...Baby One More Time"	Won	
2000	Capital Radio Awards	Favorite International Female Artist	Britney Spears	Won	
2001	Capricho Awards	Best International Female Singer	Britney Spears	Won	
2008	Capricho Awards	Best International Female Singer	Britney Spears	Won	
2008	Capricho Awards	Best International Music Video	"Piece of Me"	Won	
2017	Celebmix Awards	Philanthropist of the Year	Britney Spears	Nominated	
2020	Celebmix Awards	Biggest Inspiration	Britney Spears	Nominated	
2023	Celebmix Awards	Best Fandom	The Britney Army	Nominated	
2023	Celebmix Awards	Biggest Inspiration	Britney Spears	Won	
2023	Celebmix Awards	Pop Culture Moment of The Year	The Woman in Me	Nominated	
2002	Channel [V] Thailand Music Video Awards	Popular International Music Video	"I'm a Slave 4 U"	Won	
2004	Channel [V] Thailand Music Video Awards	Thailand Viewer's Choice	"Me Against the Music" (featuring Madonna)	Won	
2004	Channel [V] Thailand Music Video Awards	Popular International Female Artist	Britney Spears	Won	
2011	Channel [V] Thailand Music Video Awards	Popular International Female Artist	Britney Spears	Nominated	
1999	Comet Awards	Best International Newcomer	Britney Spears	Won	
2000	Comet Awards	Best International Artist	Britney Spears	Won	
2004	Comet Awards	Best International Artist	Britney Spears	Nominated	
2004	Comet Awards	Best International Video	"Toxic"	Nominated	
2008	Comet Awards	Queen of Pop 2008	Britney Spears	Won	
2002	Cosmopolitan Awards	Fun, Fearless Female of the Year	Britney Spears	Won	
2008	Cosmopolitan Awards	Ultimate Women of the Year	Britney Spears	Won	
2009	Cosmopolitan Awards	Best Celebrity Fragrance for Women	Hidden Fantasy	Nominated	
2010	Cosmopolitan Awards	Best Celebrity Fragrance for Women	Circus Fantasy	Won	
2013	Cosmopolitan Awards	Best Celebrity Fragrance for Women	Island Fantasy	Nominated	
2000	Danish Grammy Awards	Foreign Newcomer of the Year	Britney Spears	Won	
2010	Digital Song of the Year (Poland)	Foreign Song	"Womanizer"	Won	
2001	E! Awards	Entertainer of the Year	Britney Spears	Nominated	
2000	Echo Music Prize	International Newcomer of the Year	Britney Spears	Nominated	
2000	Echo Music Prize	International Rock/Pop Artist of the Year	Britney Spears	Nominated	
2001	Echo Music Prize	International Rock/Pop Artist of the Year	Britney Spears	Won	
2001	Echo Music Prize	International Rock/Pop Single of the Year	"Lucky"	Nominated	
2023	Electronic Music Awards	Dance Song of The Year (Radio)	"Hold Me Closer"	Nominated	
2023	Electronic Music Awards	Remix of The Year	"Hold Me Closer (Joel Corry Remix)"	Won	
2023	Electronic Music Awards	Remix of The Year	"Hold Me Closer (Dark Intensity Remix)"	Nominated	
2000	Emma Gaala	Foreign Artist of the Year	Britney Spears	Nominated	
2010	Emma Gaala	Foreign Artist of the Year	Britney Spears	Nominated	
2005	FHM Music & TV Awards	Sexiest Video – Public's Choice	"Toxic"	Won	
2005	FiFi Awards	Best Women's Perfume	Curious	Won	
2005	FiFi Awards	Consumer's Women Choice Awards — CosmoGirl!	Curious	Won	
2005	FiFi Awards	CosmoGirl! – Women's Luxe	Curious	Finalist	
2006	FiFi Awards	Fragrance of the Year – Women's Luxe	Fantasy	Finalist	
2011	FiFi Awards	Women's Best Packaging of the Year	Radiance	Nominated	
2016	FiFi Awards	Fragrance of the Year – Women's Popular	Fantasy Intimate Edition	Finalist	
2019	FiFi Awards	Fragrance of the Year – Women's Popular	Prerogative	Finalist	
2019	FiFi Awards	Social Media Campaign of the Year	Prerogative	Finalist	
2005	Fragrance Foundation Awards	2005 Consumer Choice – Women's	Curious	Won	
2023	Fragrance Foundation Awards	Fragrance Hall of Fame	Fantasy	Won	
1999	GAFFA Awards	Best Foreign New Artist	Britney Spears	Won	
2008	GAFFA Awards	Best Foreign Female Act	Britney Spears	5th place	
2018	GLAAD Media Awards	Vanguard Award	Britney Spears	Won	
2005	GV Music & Fashion Awards (Note: The GV Music & Fashion Awards, also known as Groovevolt, was an online music award established by the Groovevolt.com. The website's leading music sites with more than 7.5 million page views and more than 500,000 unique users each month–the website's partnerships with Bertelsmann Music Group)	Video of the Year	"Toxic"	Won	
2005	GV Music & Fashion Awards	Best Female Album	In the Zone	Won	
2005	GV Music & Fashion Awards	Best Pop Song Female Performance	"Everytime"	Won	
2005	GV Music & Fashion Awards	Most Fashionable Artist	Britney Spears	Won	
2005	Gaygalan Awards	International Song of the Year	"Toxic"	Won	
2006	Glammy Awards	The Best Fragrances	Curious	Won	
2007	Glammy Awards	The Best Fragrances	Curious	Won	
2008	Glammy Awards	The Best Fragrances	Curious	Won	
2009	Glammy Awards	The Best Fragrances	Curious	Won	
2010	Glammy Awards	The Best Fragrances	Curious	Won	
2003	Glamour Awards	Woman of the Year	Britney Spears	Won	
2010	Glamour Awards	International Musician/Solo Artist	Britney Spears	Nominated	
2012	Glamour Awards	International Musician/Solo Artist	Britney Spears	Nominated	
2003	Golden Raspberry Awards	Worst Actress (Note: Tied with Madonna in Swept Away.)	Crossroads	Won	
2003	Golden Raspberry Awards	Worst Original Song	"I'm Not a Girl, Not Yet a Woman"	Won	
2003	Golden Raspberry Awards	Worst Original Song	"Overprotected"	Nominated	
2003	Golden Raspberry Awards	Worst Screen Couple	Lucy and Ben in Crossroads (with Anson Mount)	Nominated	
2003	Golden Raspberry Awards	Most Flatulent Teen-Targeted Movie (Note: Awards and nominations Spears has received as a producer.)	Crossroads	Nominated	
2005	Golden Raspberry Awards	Worst Supporting Actress	Fahrenheit 9/11	Won	
2006	Golden Raspberry Awards	Most Tiresome Tabloid Targets	Britney Spears, Kevin Federline, and Sean Preston Federline	Nominated	
2023	Goodreads Choice Awards	Best Memoir & Autobiography	The Woman in Me	Won	
2000	Grammy Awards	Best New Artist	Britney Spears	Nominated	
2000	Grammy Awards	Best Female Pop Vocal Performance	"...Baby One More Time"	Nominated	
2001	Grammy Awards	Best Female Pop Vocal Performance	"Oops!... I Did It Again"	Nominated	
2001	Grammy Awards	Best Pop Vocal Album	Oops!... I Did It Again	Nominated	
2003	Grammy Awards	Best Pop Vocal Album	Britney	Nominated	
2003	Grammy Awards	Best Female Pop Vocal Performance	"Overprotected"	Nominated	
2005	Grammy Awards	Best Dance Recording	"Toxic"	Won	
2010	Grammy Awards	Best Dance Recording	"Womanizer"	Nominated	
2018	Hollywood Beauty Awards (Note: The Hollywood Beauty Awards (HBAs) is the annual award show recognizes the architects of beauty in hair, makeup, photography and styling in Film, TV and Music, as well as artists who create celebrity looks for the red carpet and editorial.)	Fragrance of the Year	Fantasy in Bloom	Won	
2005	Hong Kong Top Sales Music Awards	Ten Best Foreign Sales Releases	Greatest Hits: My Prerogative	2nd place	
2000	Hungarian Music Awards	Foreign Pop Album of the Year	...Baby One More Time	Nominated	
2001	Hungarian Music Awards	Foreign Pop Album of the Year	Oops!... I Did It Again	Nominated	
2009	Hungarian Music Awards	Foreign Dance-Pop Album of the Year	Circus	Nominated	
2003	International Dance Music Awards	Best Dance Video	"Me Against the Music" (featuring Madonna)	Nominated	
2003	International Dance Music Awards	Best Pop	"Me Against the Music" (featuring Madonna)	Nominated	
2005	International Dance Music Awards	Best Pop Dance Track	"Toxic"	Nominated	
2005	International Dance Music Awards	Best Dance Solo Artist	"Toxic"	Nominated	
2008	International Dance Music Awards	Best Pop Dance Track	"Gimme More"	Nominated	
2008	International Dance Music Awards	Best Dance Solo Artist	"Gimme More"	Nominated	
2009	International Dance Music Awards	Best Pop Dance Track	"Womanizer"	Nominated	
2009	International Dance Music Awards	Best Music Video	"Womanizer"	Nominated	
2009	International Dance Music Awards	Best Solo Artist	Britney Spears	Nominated	
2010	International Dance Music Awards	Best Pop Dance Track	"3"	Nominated	
2010	International Dance Music Awards	Best Music Video	"3"	Nominated	
2010	International Dance Music Awards	Best Solo Artist	Britney Spears	Nominated	
2013	International Dance Music Awards	Best Commercial/Pop Dance Track	"Scream & Shout" (with will.i.am)	Nominated	
2017	iHeartRadio Music Awards	Best Fan Army	Britney Spears	Nominated	
1999	J-Wave Awards	Song of the Year	"...Baby One More Time"	33rd place	
2000	J-Wave Awards	Song of the Year	"Oops!... I Did It Again"	42nd place	
2003	J-Wave Awards	Song of the Year	"Me Against the Music" (featuring Madonna)	28th place	
2004	J-Wave Awards	Song of the Year	"Toxic"	95th place	
2007	J-Wave Awards	Song of the Year	"Gimme More"	88th place	
2008	J-Wave Awards	Song of the Year	"Womanizer"	51st place	
2011	J-Wave Awards	Song of the Year	"Hold It Against Me"	43rd place	
2013	J-Wave Awards	Song of the Year	"Scream & Shout" (with will.i.am)	74th place	
2000	Japan Gold Disc Awards	International New Artist of the Year	Britney Spears	Won	
2003	Japan Gold Disc Awards	International Music Video of the Year Short-Form	"I'm Not a Girl, Not Yet a Woman"	Won	
2003	Japan Gold Disc Awards	International Music Video of the Year Long-Form	Britney Spears Live from Las Vegas	Won	
2004	Japan Gold Disc Awards	International Rock/Pop Album of the Year	In the Zone	Won	
2005	Japan Gold Disc Awards	International Rock/Pop Album of the Year	Greatest Hits: My Prerogative	Won	
2005	Japan Gold Disc Awards	International Music Videos of the Year	Britney Spears: In the Zone (Note: This is the ABC version released, there is also a MTV version titled Britney: In the Zone & Out All Night which has won an Emmy Award for Outstanding Achievement in Single Camera Editing in 2004. However, the award is credited to William Knight and not the performer.)	Won	
2005	Japan Gold Disc Awards	International Music Videos of the Year	Greatest Hits: My Prerogative	Won	
1999	Juno Awards	Best Selling Album (Foreign or Domestic)	...Baby One More Time	Nominated	
2000	Juno Awards	Best Selling Album (Foreign or Domestic)	Oops!... I Did It Again	Nominated	
2010	Juno Awards	International Album of the Year	Circus	Nominated	
2025	Las Culturistas Culture Awards	Most Iconic Exchange of Words	Britney Spears – “Oops!… I Did It Again” (Note: The nomination was for the dialogue exchange in the music video: “But I thought the old lady dropped it into the ocean at the end” “Well, baby, I went down and got it for you.” “Awwwww, you shouldn’t have”)	Nominated	
2011	LOS40 Music Awards	Best International Artist	Britney Spears	Nominated	
1988	LSU Tigers women's gymnastics	Gymnast	Britney Spears	Won	
2003	Lunas del Auditorio	Best International Pop Singer	Britney Spears	Nominated	
1999	M6 Awards	Best Music Video	"...Baby One More Time"	Won	
2000	MAMA Music Awards	Best International Artist	"Oops!... I Did It Again"	Won	
2002	MAMA Music Awards	Best International Artist	"I'm Not a Girl, Not Yet a Woman"	Nominated	
2009	MP3 Music Awards	Best Female Vocalist Song	"If U Seek Amy"	Nominated	
2002	MTV Asia Awards	Favorite Female Artist	Britney Spears	Won	
2003	MTV Asia Awards	Favorite Video	"I Love Rock 'n' Roll"	Nominated	
2005	MTV Asia Awards	Favorite Female Artist	Britney Spears	Nominated	
2005	MTV Australia Awards	Best Female	Britney Spears	Nominated	
2005	MTV Australia Awards	Best Dance Video	"Toxic"	Nominated	
2005	MTV Australia Awards	Sexiest Video	"Toxic"	Nominated	
2009	MTV Australia Awards	Best Moves	"Circus"	Won	
2016	MTV Digital Days	International Digital Army	Britney Spears	Won	
1999	MTV Europe Music Awards	Best Song	"...Baby One More Time"	Won	
1999	MTV Europe Music Awards	Best Pop	Britney Spears	Won	
1999	MTV Europe Music Awards	Best Female	Britney Spears	Won	
1999	MTV Europe Music Awards	Best Breakthrough Act	Britney Spears	Won	
2000	MTV Europe Music Awards	Best Female	Britney Spears	Nominated	
2000	MTV Europe Music Awards	Best Song	"Oops!... I Did It Again"	Nominated	
2000	MTV Europe Music Awards	Best Pop	Britney Spears	Nominated	
2001	MTV Europe Music Awards	Best Pop	Britney Spears	Nominated	
2002	MTV Europe Music Awards	Best Female	Britney Spears	Nominated	
2004	MTV Europe Music Awards	Best Song	"Toxic"	Nominated	
2004	MTV Europe Music Awards	Best Pop	Britney Spears	Nominated	
2004	MTV Europe Music Awards	Best Female	Britney Spears	Won	
2008	MTV Europe Music Awards	Album of the Year	Blackout	Won	
2008	MTV Europe Music Awards	Best Act of 2008	Britney Spears	Won	
2008	MTV Europe Music Awards	Best Act Ever	Britney Spears	Nominated	
2009	MTV Europe Music Awards	Best Video	"Circus"	Nominated	
2011	MTV Europe Music Awards	Best North American Act	Britney Spears	Won	
2011	MTV Europe Music Awards	Best Worldwide Act	Britney Spears	Nominated	
2011	MTV Europe Music Awards	Best Pop	Britney Spears	Nominated	
2006	MTV Italian Music Awards (Note: Previously knowns as TRL Awards from 2006—2012.)	Best No. 1 of the Year	"Do Somethin'"	Nominated	
2008	MTV Italian Music Awards	Best No. 1 of the Year	"Gimme More"	Nominated	
2008	MTV Italian Music Awards	First Lady Award	Britney Spears	Nominated	
2009	MTV Italian Music Awards	First Lady Award	Britney Spears	Nominated	
2009	MTV Italian Music Awards	Best No. 1 of the Year	"Womanizer"	Nominated	
2011	MTV Italian Music Awards	Wonder Woman Award	Britney Spears	Nominated	
2015	MTV Italian Music Awards	Artist Saga	Britney Spears	Nominated	
2016	MTV Italian Music Awards	Artist Saga	Britney Spears	Won	
2017	MTV Italian Music Awards	Artist Saga	Britney Spears	Won	
2017	MTV Italian Music Awards	MTV Award Star	Britney Spears	Nominated	
2002	MTV Movie & TV Awards (Note: Formerly known as MTV Movie Awards.)	Best Dressed	Crossroads	Nominated	
2002	MTV Movie & TV Awards	Best Female Breakthrough Performance	Crossroads	Nominated	
2021	MTV Movie & TV Awards	Best Music Documentary	Framing Britney Spears	Nominated	
2004	MTV Pilipinas Music Award	Favorite International Video	"Toxic"	Nominated	
2004	MTV Russia Music Awards	Best International Artist	Britney Spears	Nominated	
2003	MTV TRL Awards	Evolution Award	Britney Spears	Nominated	
2003	MTV TRL Awards	Free Ride Award	Britney Spears	Nominated	
2003	MTV TRL Awards	First Lady Award	Britney Spears	Won	
2003	MTV TRL Awards	Gridlock Award	Britney Spears	Nominated	
2004	MTV TRL Awards	First Lady Award	Britney Spears	Nominated	
2004	MTV TRL Awards	Gridlock Award	Britney Spears	Won	
2004	MTV TRL Awards	Rock the Mic Award	Britney Spears	Nominated	
2008	MTV TRL Awards	Queen of TRL	Britney Spears	Won	
2008	MTV TRL Awards	Most Iconic Videos of All Time	"...Baby One More Time"	Won	
2008	MTV TRL Awards	Most Iconic Clips in TRL History	"...Baby One More Time"	Won	
1999	MTV Video Music Awards	Best Pop Video	"...Baby One More Time"	Nominated	
1999	MTV Video Music Awards	Best Choreography in a Video	"...Baby One More Time"	Nominated	
1999	MTV Video Music Awards	Best Female Video	"...Baby One More Time"	Nominated	
1999	MTV Video Music Awards	International Viewer's Choice (MTV Russia)	"...Baby One More Time"	Nominated	
2000	MTV Video Music Awards	Best Dance Video	"(You Drive Me) Crazy"	Nominated	
2000	MTV Video Music Awards	Best Female Video	"Oops!... I Did It Again"	Nominated	
2000	MTV Video Music Awards	Viewer's Choice	"Oops!... I Did It Again"	Nominated	
2000	MTV Video Music Awards	Best Pop Video	"Oops!... I Did It Again"	Nominated	
2001	MTV Video Music Awards	Best Pop Video	"Stronger"	Nominated	
2002	MTV Video Music Awards	Best Female Video	"I'm a Slave 4 U"	Nominated	
2002	MTV Video Music Awards	Best Dance Video	"I'm a Slave 4 U"	Nominated	
2002	MTV Video Music Awards	Best Choreography in a Video	"I'm a Slave 4 U"	Nominated	
2003	MTV Video Music Awards	Best Video From a Film	"Boys (The Co-Ed Remix)" (featuring Pharrell Williams)	Nominated	
2004	MTV Video Music Awards	Best Female Video	"Toxic"	Nominated	
2004	MTV Video Music Awards	Best Dance Video	"Toxic"	Nominated	
2004	MTV Video Music Awards	Best Pop Video	"Toxic"	Nominated	
2004	MTV Video Music Awards	Video of the Year	"Toxic"	Nominated	
2008	MTV Video Music Awards	Best Female Video	"Piece of Me"	Won	
2008	MTV Video Music Awards	Best Pop Video	"Piece of Me"	Won	
2008	MTV Video Music Awards	Video of the Year	"Piece of Me"	Won	
2009	MTV Video Music Awards	Best Pop Video	"Womanizer"	Won	
2009	MTV Video Music Awards	Video of the Year	"Womanizer"	Nominated	
2009	MTV Video Music Awards	Best Art Direction	"Circus"	Nominated	
2009	MTV Video Music Awards	Best Choreography	"Circus"	Nominated	
2009	MTV Video Music Awards	Best Cinematography	"Circus"	Nominated	
2009	MTV Video Music Awards	Best Direction	"Circus"	Nominated	
2009	MTV Video Music Awards	Best Editing	"Circus"	Nominated	
2011	MTV Video Music Awards	Best Choreography	"Till the World Ends"	Nominated	
2011	MTV Video Music Awards	Best Pop Video	"Till the World Ends"	Won	
2011	MTV Video Music Awards	Michael Jackson Video Vanguard Award	Britney Spears	Won	
2024	MTV Video Music Awards	Most Iconic Performance in VMA History	Madonna, Britney Spears, Christina Aguilera, and Missy Elliott performing at the 2003 MTV Video Music Awards	Nominated	
2002	MTV Video Music Awards Japan	Best Female Artist	Britney Spears	Nominated	
2002	MTV Video Music Awards Japan	Best Pop Artist	Britney Spears	Nominated	
2004	MTV Video Music Awards Japan	Best Collaboration	"Me Against the Music" (featuring Madonna)	Nominated	
2004	MTV Video Music Awards Japan	Best Female Video	"Me Against the Music" (featuring Madonna)	Nominated	
2008	MTV Video Music Awards Japan	Best Female Video	"Gimme More"	Nominated	
2008	MTV Video Music Awards Japan	Best Pop Video	"Gimme More"	Nominated	
2009	MTV Video Music Awards Japan	Video of the Year	"Womanizer"	Nominated	
2009	MTV Video Music Awards Japan	Best Female Video	"Womanizer"	Nominated	
2002	MTV Video Music Awards Latin América	Best International Pop Artist	Britney Spears	Nominated	
2009	MTV Video Music Awards Latin América	Best International Pop Artist	Britney Spears	Nominated	
2009	MTV Video Music Awards Latin América	Best Fan Club	Britney Spears	Won	
2009	MTV Video Music Awards Latin América	Best Ringtone	"Womanizer"	Nominated	
2004	MTV Video Music Brazil Awards	Best International Video	"Me Against the Music" (featuring Madonna)	Nominated	
2005	MTV Video Music Brazil Awards	Best International Video	"Do Somethin'"	Nominated	
2008	MTV Video Music Brazil Awards	Best International Artist	Britney Spears	Nominated	
2009	MTV Video Music Brazil Awards	Best International Artist	Britney Spears	Won	
2011	MTV Video Music Brazil Awards	Best International Artist	Britney Spears	Nominated	
2012	MTV Video Play Awards	Most-Played Music Video of the Year	"Till the World Ends"	Platinum	
2012	MTV Video Play Awards	Most-Played Music Video of the Year	"Hold It Against Me"	Platinum	
2012	MTV Video Play Awards	Most-Played Music Video of the Year	"I Wanna Go"	Platinum	
2003	MTV Wraps Up! 2003	Best Sales Team of the Year	Britney Spears, Beyoncé, The Osbournes, and Halle Berry's Soda Pop squad	Nominated	
2003	MTV Wraps Up! 2003	Live Performances of the Year	Britney Spears, Madonna, and Christina Aguilera sings "Like a Virgin" at the 2003 MTV Video Music Awards	Won	
2003	MTV Wraps Up! 2003	Top Artist Pages	Britney Spears	Nominated	
2012	MVPA Awards (Note: MVPA Awards honor the best music videos in a variety of aspects, which includes music video production and post-production companies, as well as individuals—directors, producers, cinematographers, choreographers, stylists, production designers, editors, colorists, animators, and others. Spears's music videos have been nominated a few times in 2002, 2003, and 2004. However, the award is credited to the production of her music videos.)	Best Pop Video	"I Wanna Go"	Nominated	
2012	MVPA Awards	Best Pop Video	"Till the World Ends" (Note: Marjan Malakpour was awarded Best Styling for her work on "Till the World Ends".)	Nominated	
1999	MuchMusic Video Awards	Favorite International Artist	"...Baby One More Time"	Won	
2000	MuchMusic Video Awards	Best International Video	"Oops!... I Did It Again"	Nominated	
2000	MuchMusic Video Awards	Favorite International Artist	"Oops!... I Did It Again"	Nominated	
2004	MuchMusic Video Awards	Best International Video	"Toxic"	Nominated	
2004	MuchMusic Video Awards	Favorite International Artist	"Toxic"	Nominated	
2009	MuchMusic Video Awards	Best International Video	"Womanizer"	Nominated	
2009	MuchMusic Video Awards	Favorite International Artist	"Womanizer"	Nominated	
2011	MuchMusic Video Awards	Best International Video	"Till the World Ends"	Nominated	
2011	MuchMusic Video Awards	Favorite International Artist	"Till the World Ends"	Nominated	
2013	MuchMusic Video Awards	Best International Video	"Scream & Shout" (with will.i.am)	Nominated	
2016	Music Choice Awards	Icon Award	Britney Spears	Won	
1999	Music Week Awards	Highest Selling Singles Artist in the UK	Britney Spears	Won	
2019	Music Week Awards	Marketing Campaign	Britney Spears	Won	
2000	My VH1 Music Awards	Best Stage Spectacle	Britney Spears	Nominated	
2000	My VH1 Music Awards	Booty Shake	Britney Spears	Nominated	
2000	My VH1 Music Awards	You Want Fries with That Album?	Britney Spears	Nominated	
2001	My VH1 Music Awards	Navel Academy	Britney Spears	Won	
2001	My VH1 Music Awards	Is It Hot in Here or Is It Just My Video	"Don't Let Me Be the Last to Know"	Nominated	
2001	My VH1 Music Awards	There's No "I" In "Team"	"What's Going On"	Won	
2006	My VH1 Music Awards	Big Mama	Britney Spears	Won	
2009	Myx Music Award	Favorite International Video	"Womanizer"	Nominated	
2002	NME Awards	Best Pop Act	Britney Spears	Nominated	
2005	NME Awards	Worst Style	Britney Spears	Won	
2008	NME Awards	Worst Album	Blackout	Won	
2009	NME Awards	Worst Album	Circus	Nominated	
2008	NRJ Music Awards	International Album of the Year	Blackout	Won	
2009	NRJ Music Awards	International Video of the Year	"Womanizer"	Won	
2009	NRJ Music Awards	International Female Artist of the Year	Britney Spears	Won	
2012	NRJ Music Awards	International Female Artist of the Year	Britney Spears	Nominated	
2022	NRJ Music Awards	International Collaboration of the Year	"Hold Me Closer" (with Elton John)	Nominated	
2018	National Music Publishers' Association	Songwriting Achievement Award	"Everytime"	Gold	
2018	National Music Publishers' Association	Songwriting Achievement Award	"Make Me" (featuring G-Eazy)	Gold	
2018	National Music Publishers' Association	Songwriting Achievement Award	"Me Against the Music" (featuring Madonna)	Gold	
2018	National Music Publishers' Association	Songwriting Achievement Award	"Work Bitch"	Platinum	
2002	Neil Bogart Memorial Fund	Children's Choice Award	Britney Spears	Won	
2006	New York Dog Award	World's Worst Celebrity Dog Owner	Britney Spears	Won	
2009	NewNowNext Awards	Always Next, Forever Now Award	Britney Spears	Won	
2009	Nickelodeon Brazil Kids' Choice Awards	Personality of the Year	Britney Spears	Nominated	
2000	Nickelodeon Kids' Choice Awards	Favorite Female Singer	Britney Spears	Won	
2000	Nickelodeon Kids' Choice Awards	Favorite Song	"(You Drive Me) Crazy"	Nominated	
2001	Nickelodeon Kids' Choice Awards	Favorite Female Singer	Britney Spears	Won	
2001	Nickelodeon Kids' Choice Awards	Favorite Song	"Oops!... I Did It Again"	Nominated	
2002	Nickelodeon Kids' Choice Awards	Favorite Female Singer	Britney Spears	Nominated	
2002	Nickelodeon Kids' Choice Awards	Favorite Song	"Don't Let Me Be the Last to Know"	Nominated	
2003	Nickelodeon Kids' Choice Awards	Favorite Female Singer	Britney Spears	Nominated	
2005	Nickelodeon Kids' Choice Awards	Favorite Song	"Toxic"	Nominated	
2004	Now! Music Awards	Most Essential Song	"Toxic"	Won	
2004	Now! Music Awards	Best Song	"Toxic"	Won	
2004	Now! Music Awards	Best Video	"Toxic"	Won	
2018	Now! Music Awards	Best Song of the Last 35 Years	"...Baby One More Time"	Won	
2018	Now! Music Awards	Best Song of the Decade '90s	"...Baby One More Time"	Won	
2018	Now! Music Awards	Best Now Female	Britney Spears	Won	
2018	Now! Music Awards	Best Song of the Decade 2000s	"Toxic"	Won	
1992	Outer Critics Circle Awards	Best Off-Broadway Musical	The cast of Ruthless! (Note: Shared with Laura Bell Bundy, Natalie Portman, Donna English, Susan Mansur and Joel Vig.)	Nominated	
2000	People's Choice Awards	Favorite Female Music Performer	Britney Spears	Nominated	
2001	People's Choice Awards	Favorite Female Music Performer	Britney Spears	Nominated	
2002	People's Choice Awards	Favorite Female Music Performer	Britney Spears	Nominated	
2005	People's Choice Awards	Favorite Female Music Performer	Britney Spears	Nominated	
2009	People's Choice Awards	Favorite Scene Stealing Guest Star	How I Met Your Mother	Nominated	
2010	People's Choice Awards	Favorite Female Artist	Britney Spears	Nominated	
2010	People's Choice Awards	Favorite Pop Artist	Britney Spears	Nominated	
2011	People's Choice Awards	Favorite TV Guest Star	Glee	Nominated	
2012	People's Choice Awards	Favorite Album of the Year	Femme Fatale	Nominated	
2013	People's Choice Awards	Favorite Celebrity Judge	The X Factor	Nominated	
2014	People's Choice Awards	Favorite Female Artist	Britney Spears	Nominated	
2014	People's Choice Awards	Favorite Pop Artist	Britney Spears	Won	
2014	People's Choice Awards	Favorite Music Fan Following	Britney Spears	Nominated	
2016	People's Choice Awards	Favorite Social Media Celebrity	Britney Spears	Won	
2017	People's Choice Awards	Favorite Pop Artist	Britney Spears	Won	
2017	People's Choice Awards	Favorite Female Artist	Britney Spears	Won	
2017	People's Choice Awards	Favorite Social Media Celebrity	Britney Spears	Won	
2017	People's Choice Awards	Favorite Comedic Collaboration	Britney Spears and Ellen DeGeneres	Won	
2018	People's Choice Awards	The Concert Tour of 2018	Piece of Me Tour	Nominated	
2020	People's Choice Awards	The Social Celebrity of 2020	Britney Spears	Nominated	
2021	People's Choice Awards	The Social Celebrity of 2021	Britney Spears	Won	
2022	People's Choice Awards	The Collaboration Song of 2022	"Hold Me Closer" (with Elton John)	Nominated	
2024	People's Choice Awards	The Social Celebrity of 2024	Britney Spears	Nominated	
2001	PepsiCo Award	People's Choice for Best Female Artist	Britney Spears	Won	
2000	PPCA Awards	Most Broadcast Artist	Britney Spears	Won	
2000	PPCA Awards	Most Broadcast Recordings	"Sometimes"	Won	
2000	PPCA Awards	Most Broadcast Recordings	"(You Drive Me) Crazy"	Won	
2001	PPCA Awards	Most Broadcast Artist	Britney Spears	Won	
2004	PPCA Awards	Most Broadcast Artist	Britney Spears	Won	
2004	PPCA Awards	Most Broadcast Recordings	"Toxic"	Won	
2005	PPCA Awards	Most Broadcast Artist	Britney Spears	Won	
2005	PPCA Awards	Most Broadcast Recordings	"Everytime"	Won	
2005	PPCA Awards	Most Broadcast Recordings	"My Prerogative"	Won	
2005	PPCA Awards	Most Broadcast Recordings	"Do Somethin'"	Won	
2008	PPCA Awards	Most Broadcast Artist	Britney Spears	Won	
2008	PPCA Awards	Most Broadcast Recordings	"Piece of Me"	Won	
2008	PPCA Awards	Most Broadcast Recordings	"Gimme More"	Won	
2009	PPCA Awards	Most Broadcast Artist	Britney Spears	Won	
2009	PPCA Awards	Most Broadcast Recordings	"Circus"	Won	
2009	PPCA Awards	Most Broadcast Recordings	"If U Seek Amy"	Won	
2009	PPCA Awards	Most Broadcast Recordings	"Womanizer"	Won	
2010	PPCA Awards	Most Broadcast Artist	Britney Spears	Won	
2010	PPCA Awards	Most Broadcast Recordings	"3"	Won	
1999	Pollstar Awards	Best New Artist Tour	...Baby One More Time Tour	Nominated	
2002	Pollstar Awards	Creative Stage Production	Dream Within a Dream Tour (Note: The Dream Within a Dream Tour was recorded and broadcast on HBO, titled as Britney Spears Live from Las Vegas, and won an Emmy Award in Outstanding Technical Direction, Camerawork, Video Control for a Limited Series, Movie, or Special category at the 54th Primetime Emmy Awards. However, the award is credited to Camera Operator, Video Control, and Technical Director, and not the performer.)	Nominated	
2009	Pollstar Awards	Most Creative Stage Production	The Circus Starring Britney Spears	Nominated	
1999	Pop Corn Music Awards (Poland)	Best International Artist	Britney Spears	Won	
2011	PopCrush Fan Choice Awards (Note: Formerly known as PopCrush Music Awards.)	Artist of the Year	Britney Spears	Nominated	
2011	PopCrush Fan Choice Awards	Album of the Year	Femme Fatale	Nominated	
2011	PopCrush Fan Choice Awards	Song of the Year	"Till the World Ends"	Nominated	
2012	PopCrush Fan Choice Awards	Perfume of the Year	Fantasy Twist	Nominated	
2014	PopCrush Fan Choice Awards	Song of the Year	"Work Bitch"	Nominated	
2014	PopCrush Fan Choice Awards	Video of the Year	"Work Bitch"	Nominated	
2014	PopCrush Fan Choice Awards	Best Music Documentary	I Am Britney Jean	Nominated	
2014	PopCrush Fan Choice Awards	Biggest Music Comeback	Britney Spears	Runner-up	
2015	PopCrush Fan Choice Awards	Best Magazine Cover	Britney Spears on Women's Health	Won	
2016	PopCrush Fan Choice Awards	Best Album	Glory	Runner-up	
2016	PopCrush Fan Choice Awards	Best Pop Collaboration	"Make Me" (featuring G-Eazy)	Nominated	
2016	PopCrush Fan Choice Awards	Best Music Video	"Slumber Party" (featuring Tinashe)	4th place	
2016	PopCrush Fan Choice Awards	Best Social Media	Britney Spears	Runner-up	
1999	Premios Amigo	Best International New Comer	Britney Spears	Won	
2004	Premios Oye!	English Album of the Year	In the Zone	Nominated	
2004	Premios Oye!	English Record of the Year	"Toxic"	Nominated	
2009	Premios Oye!	English Album of the Year	Circus	Nominated	
2009	Premios Oye!	English Record of the Year	"Womanizer"	Nominated	
1999	Radio Music Awards	Song of the Year	"...Baby One More Time"	Nominated	
2001	Radio Disney Music Awards	Best Female Artist	Britney Spears	Nominated	
2002	Radio Disney Music Awards	Best Female Artist	Britney Spears	Nominated	
2014	Radio Disney Music Awards	Favorite Song from a Movie or TV Show	"Ooh La La"	Nominated	
2014	Radio Disney Music Awards	Best Song That Makes You Smile	"Ooh La La"	Won	
2017	Radio Disney Music Awards	Icon Award	Britney Spears	Won	
1999	The Record of the Year	Record of the Year	"...Baby One More Time"	Won	
1999	Rennbahn Express Awards	Song of the Year	"...Baby One More Time"	3rd place	
1999	Rennbahn Express Awards	Star of the Year	Britney Spears	Won	
1999	Rennbahn Express Awards	Singer of the Year	Britney Spears	Won	
1999	Rennbahn Express Awards	Newcomer of the Year	Britney Spears	Won	
1999	Rockbjörnen	Foreign Artist of the Year	Britney Spears	Won	
2008	Rockbjörnen	Foreign Artist of the Year	Britney Spears	Nominated	
2004	RTHK Top 10 Gold Songs Awards (Note: The RTHK Top 10 Gold Songs Awards is an annual award show presented at RTHK Studio 1 that honors the best in international and national music established in 1989.)	Top Ten International Gold Songs	"Me Against the Music" (featuring Madonna)	Gold	
2005	RTHK Top 10 Gold Songs Awards	Top Ten International Gold Songs	"My Prerogative"	Silver	
2008	RTHK Top 10 Gold Songs Awards	Top Ten International Gold Songs	"Gimme More"	Gold	
2009	RTHK Top 10 Gold Songs Awards	Top Ten International Gold Songs	"Womanizer"	Gold	
2012	RTHK Top 10 Gold Songs Awards	Top Ten International Gold Songs	"Till the World Ends"	Gold	
2023	RTHK Top 10 Gold Songs Awards	Top Ten International Gold Songs	"Mind Your Business"	Nominated	
2023	RTHK Top 10 Gold Songs Awards	Top Female Singer	Britney Spears	Nominated	
2009	Sa Sa Awards	Best Celebrity Fragrance of the Year	Fantasy	Won	
2010	Shorty Awards	Celebrity of the Year	Britney Spears	Nominated	
2010	Shorty Awards	Best Humor	Britney Spears	Nominated	
2010	Shorty Awards	Best Apps	Britney Spears	Nominated	
2010	Shorty Awards	Best in Art	Britney Spears	Nominated	
2010	Shorty Awards	Best in Music	Britney Spears	Won	
2011	Shorty Awards	Celebrity of the Year	Britney Spears	Nominated	
2011	Shorty Awards	Best in Innovation	Britney Spears	Nominated	
2011	Shorty Awards	Best in Entertainment	Britney Spears	Nominated	
2011	Shorty Awards	Best in Fashion	Britney Spears	Nominated	
2011	Shorty Awards	Best in Music	Britney Spears	Nominated	
2012	Shorty Awards	Celebrity of the Year	Britney Spears	Nominated	
2012	Shorty Awards	Best Life Saving Hero	Britney Spears	Nominated	
2012	Shorty Awards	Best Mom	Britney Spears	Nominated	
2012	Shorty Awards	Best in Music	Britney Spears	Nominated	
2012	Shorty Awards	Best Singer	Britney Spears	Nominated	
2013	Shorty Awards	Celebrity of the Year	Britney Spears	Nominated	
2013	Shorty Awards	Best Twitter	Britney Spears	Nominated	
2013	Shorty Awards	Best Singer	Britney Spears	Nominated	
2013	Shorty Awards	Best in Music	Britney Spears	Nominated	
2014	Shorty Awards	Celebrity of the Year	Britney Spears	Nominated	
2014	Shorty Awards	Best Singer	Britney Spears	Nominated	
2014	Shorty Awards	Best in Music	Britney Spears	Nominated	
2014	Shorty Awards	Best Fashion	Britney Spears	Nominated	
2014	Shorty Awards	Best Brazil	Britney Spears	Nominated	
2017	Shorty Awards	Best in Music	Britney Spears	Nominated	
1999	Smash Hits Poll Winners Party	Best New Act	Britney Spears	4th place	
1999	Smash Hits Poll Winners Party	Best Female Solo Star	Britney Spears	Won	
1999	Smash Hits Poll Winners Party	Best Female Artist	Britney Spears	Won	
1999	Smash Hits Poll Winners Party	Best Dress Female Artist	Britney Spears	Won	
1999	Smash Hits Poll Winners Party	Best Female Haircut	Britney Spears	Won	
1999	Smash Hits Poll Winners Party	Best Dancer in Pop	Britney Spears	Won	
2000	Smash Hits Poll Winners Party	Best Female Artist	Britney Spears	Won	
2000	Smash Hits Poll Winners Party	Best Dancer in Pop	Britney Spears	Won	
2000	Smash Hits Poll Winners Party	Best Dressed Female	Britney Spears	Won	
2000	Smash Hits Poll Winners Party	Most Fanciable Female on the Planet	Britney Spears	Won	
2000	Smash Hits Poll Winners Party	Best Haircut	Britney Spears	7th place	
2000	Smash Hits Poll Winners Party	Worst Female Singer	Britney Spears	4th place	
2000	Smash Hits Poll Winners Party	Worst Dressed Person	Britney Spears	5th place	
2000	Smash Hits Poll Winners Party	Best Single	"Oops!... I Did It Again"	7th place	
2000	Smash Hits Poll Winners Party	Best Single	"Lucky"	10th place	
2000	Smash Hits Poll Winners Party	Best Video	"Lucky"	9th place	
2000	Smash Hits Poll Winners Party	Worst Video	"Lucky"	9th place	
2000	Smash Hits Poll Winners Party	Worst Single	"Lucky"	5th place	
2000	Smash Hits Poll Winners Party	Best Album	Oops!... I Did It Again	7th place	
2000	Smash Hits Poll Winners Party	Worst Album	Oops!... I Did It Again	7th place	
2001	Smash Hits Poll Winners Party	Best Female Artist	Britney Spears	Won	
2002	Smash Hits Poll Winners Party	Best Female Solo Star	Britney Spears	Runner-up	
2002	Smash Hits Poll Winners Party	Best International Act	Britney Spears	4th place	
2002	Smash Hits Poll Winners Party	Most Fanciable Female on the Planet	Britney Spears	3rd place	
2004	Smash Hits Poll Winners Party	Best Solo Artist	Britney Spears	3rd place	
2004	Smash Hits Poll Winners Party	Most Fanciable Female on the Planet	Britney Spears	Runner-up	
2004	Smash Hits Poll Winners Party	Favorite Ringtone	"Toxic"	Runner-up	
2004	Smash Hits Poll Winners Party	Worst Dressed Star	Britney Spears	Runner-up	
2005	Smash Hits Poll Winners Party	Worst Dressed Star	Britney Spears	Won	
2005	Smash Hits Poll Winners Party	Flop Mop	Britney Spears	Runner-up	
2005	Smash Hits Poll Winners Party	Smash Hits Hall of Fame	Britney Spears	Won	
1992	Star Search	Best Junior Vocalist	Britney Spears	Won	
2002	Stinkers Bad Movie Awards	Worst Actress	Crossroads	Nominated	
2002	Stinkers Bad Movie Awards	Worst On-screen Couple	Lucy and Ben in Crossroads (with Anson Mount)	Nominated	
2002	Stinkers Bad Movie Awards	Worst Original Song	"I'm Not a Girl, Not Yet a Woman"	Nominated	
2002	Stinkers Bad Movie Awards	Worst Original Song	"Overprotected"	Longlisted	
2002	Stinkers Bad Movie Awards	Worst Original Song	"I Love Rock 'n' Roll"	Longlisted	
2002	Stinkers Bad Movie Awards	Worst Original Song	"Boys"	Longlisted	
2002	Stinkers Bad Movie Awards	Most Distracting Celebrity Cameo Appearance	The cast of Austin Powers in Goldmember (Note: Shared with Tom Cruise, Gwyneth Paltrow, Kevin Spacey, Danny DeVito, Steven Spielberg, and John Travolta.)	Nominated	
2004	Space Shower Music Awards	Best International Female Video	"Me Against the Music" (featuring Madonna)	Nominated	
2003	Spin Awards	Worst Song	"Me Against the Music" (featuring Madonna)	Won	
2003	Spin Awards	Worst Dressed	Britney Spears	Won	
2003	Spin Awards	Worst Solo Artist	Britney Spears	Won	
2004	Spin Awards	Worst Solo Artist	Britney Spears	Runner-up	
2004	Spin Awards	Worst Dressed	Britney Spears	Runner-up	
2005	Spin Awards	Worst Solo Artist	Britney Spears	Runner-up	
2005	Spin Awards	Worst Dressed	Britney Spears	Won	
2023	Spotify Plaques	1,000,000,000 Streams	"Toxic"	Won	
1999	Teen Choice Awards	Choice Female Artist	Britney Spears	Nominated	
1999	Teen Choice Awards	Choice Breakout Artist	Britney Spears	Nominated	
1999	Teen Choice Awards	Choice Female Hottie	Britney Spears	Nominated	
1999	Teen Choice Awards	Choice Single	"...Baby One More Time"	Won	
1999	Teen Choice Awards	Choice Music Video	"...Baby One More Time"	Nominated	
1999	Teen Choice Awards	Choice Album	...Baby One More Time	Won	
2000	Teen Choice Awards	Choice Female Artist	Britney Spears	Won	
2000	Teen Choice Awards	Choice Female Hottie	Britney Spears	Won	
2000	Teen Choice Awards	Choice Single	"Oops!... I Did It Again"	Nominated	
2000	Teen Choice Awards	Choice Music Video	"Oops!... I Did It Again"	Nominated	
2000	Teen Choice Awards	Choice Song of the Summer	"Oops!... I Did It Again"	Nominated	
2000	Teen Choice Awards	Choice Album	Oops!... I Did It Again	Nominated	
2000	Teen Choice Awards	Choice Love Song	"From the Bottom of My Broken Heart"	Nominated	
2001	Teen Choice Awards	Choice Single	"Stronger"	Nominated	
2001	Teen Choice Awards	Choice Female Artist	Britney Spears	Won	
2001	Teen Choice Awards	Choice Female Hottie	Britney Spears	Nominated	
2002	Teen Choice Awards	Choice Female Fashion Icon	Britney Spears	Nominated	
2002	Teen Choice Awards	Choice Female Artist	Britney Spears	Won	
2002	Teen Choice Awards	Choice Female Hottie	Britney Spears	Won	
2002	Teen Choice Awards	Choice Music – Single	"I'm a Slave 4 U"	Won	
2002	Teen Choice Awards	Choice Movie Actress – Drama/Action Adventure	Crossroads	Nominated	
2002	Teen Choice Awards	Choice Breakout Movie Actress	Crossroads	Nominated	
2002	Teen Choice Awards	Choice Movie Chemistry	Lucy and Ben in Crossroads (with Anson Mount)	Nominated	
2003	Teen Choice Awards	Choice Female Hottie	Britney Spears	Nominated	
2003	Teen Choice Awards	Choice Female Fashion Icon	Britney Spears	Nominated	
2004	Teen Choice Awards	Choice Female Artist	Britney Spears	Nominated	
2004	Teen Choice Awards	Choice Female Hottie	Britney Spears	Nominated	
2004	Teen Choice Awards	Choice Music Tour	The Onyx Hotel Tour	Nominated	
2004	Teen Choice Awards	Choice Single	"Toxic"	Won	
2004	Teen Choice Awards	Choice Love Song	"Everytime"	Nominated	
2004	Teen Choice Awards	Choice Hook Up	"Me Against the Music" (featuring Madonna)	Nominated	
2005	Teen Choice Awards	Choice TV Show: Reality	Britney and Kevin: Chaotic	Nominated	
2005	Teen Choice Awards	Choice TV: Female Personality	Britney and Kevin: Chaotic	Nominated	
2005	Teen Choice Awards	Choice Female Artist	Britney Spears	Nominated	
2007	Teen Choice Awards	Choice OMG! Moment	Britney Spears shaving her head	Won	
2008	Teen Choice Awards	Choice Female Artist	Britney Spears	Nominated	
2008	Teen Choice Awards	Choice Most Fanatic Fans	Britney Spears	Nominated	
2009	Teen Choice Awards	Choice Female Artist	Britney Spears	Nominated	
2009	Teen Choice Awards	Ultimate Choice Award	Britney Spears	Won	
2009	Teen Choice Awards	Choice Music Tour	The Circus Starring Britney Spears	Nominated	
2009	Teen Choice Awards	Choice Single	"Circus"	Nominated	
2011	Teen Choice Awards	Choice Female Summer Music	Britney Spears	Nominated	
2014	Teen Choice Awards	Choice Social Media Queen	Britney Spears	Nominated	
2015	Teen Choice Awards	Choice Music: Collaboration	"Pretty Girls" (with Iggy Azalea)	Nominated	
2015	Teen Choice Awards	Choice Female Music	"Pretty Girls" (with Iggy Azalea)	Nominated	
2015	Teen Choice Awards	Candie's Style Icon	Britney Spears	Won	
2016	Teen Choice Awards	Choice Social Media Queen	Britney Spears	Nominated	
2016	Teen Choice Awards	Choice Twitter	Britney Spears	Nominated	
2016	Teen Choice Awards	Choice Instagrammer	Britney Spears	Nominated	
1999	Teen Entertainment Awards	Hottest Female	Britney Spears	Won	
2000	Teen Entertainment Awards	Coolest MTV Video	Britney Spears	Nominated	
2000	Teen Entertainment Awards	Fave Female Artist	Britney Spears	Nominated	
2000	Teen Entertainment Awards	Most Stylish Female Artist	Britney Spears	Nominated	
2000	Teen Entertainment Awards	Best Untrue Gossip	Britney Spears	Nominated	
1999	Teen People Awards	21 Hottest Stars Under 21	Britney Spears	Won	
2000	Teen People Awards	25 Hottest Stars Under 25	Britney Spears	Won	
2000	Teen People Awards	Pop Princess of the Year	Britney Spears	Won	
2001	Teen People Awards	25 Hottest Stars Under 25	Britney Spears	Won	
2000	TMF Awards (Belgium)	Best International Female Artist	Britney Spears	Won	
2005	TMF Awards (Belgium)	Best International Female Artist	Britney Spears	Nominated	
2009	TMF Awards (Belgium)	Best International Female Artist	Britney Spears	Won	
2009	TMF Awards (Belgium)	Best Pop International	Britney Spears	Won	
2009	TMF Awards (Belgium)	Best Live International	Britney Spears	Won	
1999	TMF Awards (Holland)	Best International Newcomer	Britney Spears	Won	
2000	TMF Awards (Holland)	Best International Female Artist	Britney Spears	Won	
2001	Top of the Pops Awards	Best Pop Act	Britney Spears	Nominated	
2002	Top of the Pops Awards	Top Fansite Artist	Britney Spears	Nominated	
2003	Top of the Pops Awards	Best Official Site	Britney Spears	4th place	
2003	Top of the Pops Awards	Most Gorge Girl	Britney Spears	4th place	
2003	Top of the Pops Awards	Shameless Exhibitionist	Britney Spears	Won	
2003	Top of the Pops Awards	Gibbering Fool	Britney Spears	Runner-up	
2003	Top of the Pops Awards	Most Annoying Voice	Britney Spears	Runner-up	
2003	Top of the Pops Awards	Most Doogy Clobber	Britney Spears	3rd place	
2000	TVHits Awards	Best Female Artist	Britney Spears	Won	
2008	The Perezzies	Most Improved	Britney Spears	Won	
2009	The Perezzies	Most Improved	Britney Spears	Won	
2007	Virgin Media Music Awards	Disaster of the Year	Britney Spears	Runner-up	
2007	Virgin Media Music Awards	Best Album	Blackout	3rd place	
2008	Virgin Media Music Awards	Best Album	Circus	Runner-up	
2008	Virgin Media Music Awards	Best Track	"Womanizer"	Runner-up	
2008	Virgin Media Music Awards	Best International Act	Britney Spears	Runner-up	
2008	Virgin Media Music Awards	Legend of the Year	Britney Spears	3rd place	
2008	Virgin Media Music Awards	Best Comeback	Britney Spears	Runner-up	
2009	Virgin Media Music Awards	Best Solo Female	Britney Spears	Won	
2009	Virgin Media Music Awards	Twit of the Year	Britney Spears	Won	
2021	Virgin Radio UK Awards	The Ultimate Pride Anthem	"Stronger"	9th place	
1993	The Walt Disney Company	Mousekeeter	The Mickey Mouse Club	Won	
2008	The Weblog Awards	Best Celebrity Blogger	Britney Spears	Nominated	
2012	What Is Sexy? Awards	Sexiest Songstress	Britney Spears	Won	
2024	World of Wonder	Best Book (The Reading is Fundamental Award)	The Woman in Me	Nominated	
2000	World Music Awards	World's Best-selling Dance Artist	Britney Spears	Won	
2000	World Music Awards	World's Best-selling Female Pop Artist	Britney Spears	Won	
2001	World Music Awards	World's Best-selling Female Pop Artist	Britney Spears	Won	
2002	World Music Awards	World's Best-selling Female Pop Artist	Britney Spears	Nominated	
2012	World Music Awards	World's Best Female Artist	Britney Spears	Canceled	
2014	World Music Awards	World's Best Song	"Work Bitch"	Nominated	
2014	World Music Awards	World's Best Song	"Ooh La La"	Nominated	
2014	World Music Awards	World's Best Song	"Scream & Shout" (with will.i.am)	Nominated	
2014	World Music Awards	World's Best Song	"Perfume"	Nominated	
2014	World Music Awards	World's Best Album	Britney Jean	Nominated	
2014	World Music Awards	World's Best Video	"Work Bitch"	Nominated	
2014	World Music Awards	World's Best Video	"Ooh La La"	Nominated	
2014	World Music Awards	World's Best Video	"Scream & Shout" (with will.i.am)	Nominated	
2014	World Music Awards	World's Best Video	"Perfume"	Nominated	
2014	World Music Awards	World's Best Female Artist	Britney Spears	Nominated	
2014	World Music Awards	World's Best Entertainer of the Year	Britney Spears	Nominated	
2014	World Music Awards	World's Best Live Act	Britney Spears	Nominated	
2014	World Music Awards	World's Best Fanbase	Britney Spears	Won	
2005	XM Satellite Radio Awards	Dream Duets	Britney Spears	Nominated	
1999	YoungStar Awards	Best Young Recording Artist or Musical Group	"...Baby One More Time"	Won	
2007	Z100 Awards	Biggest Celebrity Scandal	Britney Spears Hitting People with Her Car	Runner-up	
2007	Z100 Awards	Most Overexposed Celebrity	Britney Spears	Won	
2008	Z100 Awards	Most Overexposed Celebrity	Britney Spears	Runner-up	
2009	Z100 Awards	Most Overexposed Celebrity	Britney Spears	3rd place	
2010	Z100 Awards	Favorite Glee Episode	"Britney/Brittany" (Note: Shared with Heather Morris.) (Note: This episode was the most-watched episode of the Glee series with 13.51 million viewers.)	Won	
2011	Z100 Awards	Collaboration of the Year	"S&M" (remix) (with Rihanna)	Won	
2011	Z100 Awards	Favorite Fan Site	Britney Spears	3rd place	
2002	Zamu Music Awards	Best International Artist	Britney Spears	Won	
1999	Žebřík Music Awards	Best International Artist	Britney Spears	3rd place	
2000	Žebřík Music Awards	Best International Artist	Britney Spears	4th place	
2001	Žebřík Music Awards	Best International Artist	Britney Spears	Nominated	
2002	Žebřík Music Awards	Best International Artist	Britney Spears	5th place	
2003	Žebřík Music Awards	Best International Artist	Britney Spears	3rd place	
2004	Žebřík Music Awards	Best International Artist	Britney Spears	5th place	
2005	Žebřík Music Awards	Best International Artist	Britney Spears	4th place	
2006	Žebřík Music Awards	Best International Artist	Britney Spears	5th place	
2007	Žebřík Music Awards	Best International Artist	Britney Spears	Won	
2008	Žebřík Music Awards	Best International Female	Britney Spears	Nominated	
2008	Žebřík Music Awards	Best International Artist	Britney Spears	Won	
2009	Žebřík Music Awards	Best International Artist	Britney Spears	4th place	

== Other accolades ==
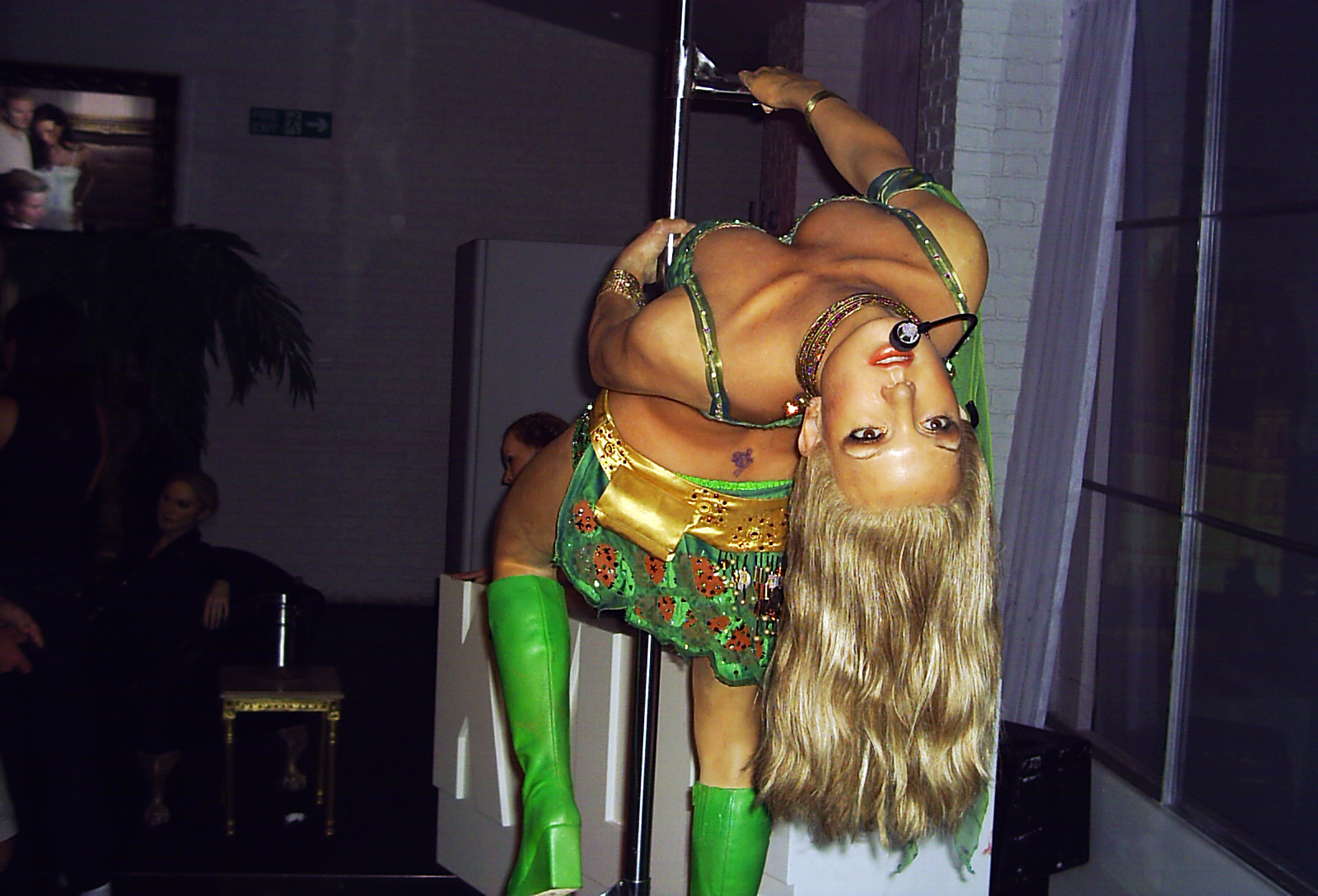
Spears's wax figures at the London Madame Tussauds

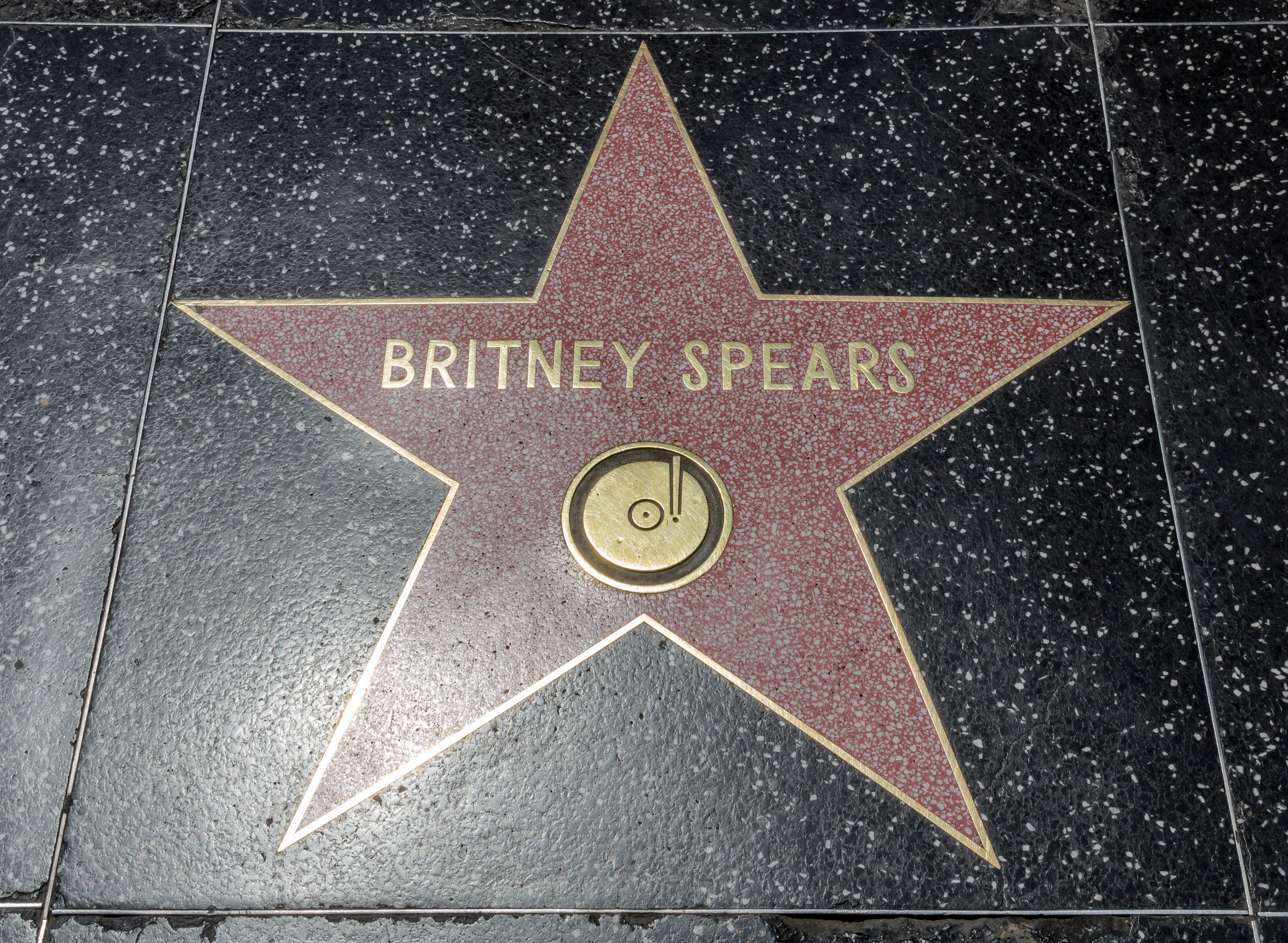
Spears's star on the Hollywood Walk of Fame

=== State and cultural honors ===
Key
‡	Indicates an honor Britney Spears was considered for only

State and cultural honors for Spears
Country	Year	Honor	Ref.
United States	1992	Miss Talent USA	
United States	1993	Outstanding Achievement in The Mickey Mouse Club	
United States	1993	‡ April 24, Kentwood, Louisiana (Britney Spears's Day)	
United States	1999	Outstanding Achievement Honor by Hammond Square Mall	
United States	1999	‡ July 10, Tangipahoa Parish, Louisiana (Britney Spears's Day)	
United States	1999	Inducted into the Young Hollywood Hall of Fame (Music Artist Category)	
United States	2000	Key to Camden County	
United States	2003	Star on Hollywood Walk of Fame (Recording Category)	
United States	2006	Daniel Edwards's sculpture of Britney Spears giving birth (Note: Edwards titled the piece Monument to Pro-Life: The Birth of Sean Preston, explaining that it symbolized Spears' decision to put childbirth ahead of her career.)	
United States	2011	‡ March 29, San Francisco (Britney Spears's Day)	
United States	2012	Handprint on Grauman's Chinese Theatre	
United States	2014	‡ November 5, Las Vegas (Britney Spears's Day)	
United States	2014	Key to Las Vegas	
United States	2017	‡ Nevada Childhood Cancer Foundation's Britney Spears Campus	

=== World records ===
Name of publication, year the record was awarded, name of the record, and the name of the record holder
Publication	Year	World record	Record holder	R. Status	Ref.
Guinness World Records	2000	Best-selling album by a teenage solo artist	...Baby One More Time	Record	
Guinness World Records	2000	Teenage female solo artist with most number-one hits (US artist)	Britney Spears	Record	
Guinness World Records	2001	Most UK number-one singles by a teenage solo artist (Note: The number-one singles are "...Baby One More Time", "Born to Make You Happy", and "Oops!... I Did It Again".)	Britney Spears	Record	
Guinness World Records	2001	Fastest-selling album by a teenage solo artist	Oops!... I Did It Again	Record	
Guinness World Records	2003	Highest annual earnings ever for a female singer (Note: Spears held this record for five years before she lost it to Beyoncé in 2008.)	Britney Spears	Eliminated	
Guinness World Records	2003	Best-selling teenage artist	Britney Spears	Record	
Guinness World Records	2003	Most expensive TV advertising campaign ($8.1 million) (Note: Spears's commercials for Pepsi Cola.)	Britney Spears	Record	
Guinness World Records	2004	First female artist to debut at number one with their first four albums in US	Britney Spears	Record	
Guinness World Records	2004	Best start on the US album chart by a female artist	Britney Spears	Record	
Guinness World Records	2005	Largest TV audience for a performance (340 million viewers) (Note: Madonna, Britney Spears, Christina Aguilera, and Missy Elliott performance at the 2003 MTV Video Music Awards.)	Britney Spears	Record	
Guinness World Records	2005	Biggest-selling teenage artist	Britney Spears	Record	
Guinness World Records	2007	Most searched person on the Internet (Note: Spears held this record for five years before she lost it to Lady Gaga in 2011.)	Britney Spears	Eliminated	
Guinness World Records	2010	Youngest female to have five number-one studio albums	Britney Spears	Record	
Guinness World Records	2011	Most products placement in a music video	"Hold It Against Me" (Note: Spears only held this record for a short time. Later, Guinness World Records officially declared this record belongs to Lady Gaga and Beyoncé for "Telephone".)	Eliminated	
