= Crossroads (2002 soundtrack) =

2002 soundtrack album by various artists

Crossroads (Music from the Major Motion Picture)

Soundtrack album by various artists
- Released: 2002
- Genre: Pop
- Length: 23:42
- Labels: Zomba; Jive
- Producers: Rodney Jerkins; The Neptunes; Fred Maher; Matthew Sweet; Dennis Herring; Jaret Reddick; Max Martin; Rami Yacoub

Crossroads (Music from the Major Motion Picture) is the soundtrack to the 2002 film Crossroads starring Britney Spears, Anson Mount, Zoe Saldaña, Taryn Manning, Kim Cattrall, and Dan Aykroyd, directed by Tamra Davis from a screenplay written by Shonda Rhimes. The soundtrack was released by Zomba Music and Jive Records in 2002 and features six songs. Spears performed three tracks that were used in Crossroads: "I Love Rock 'n' Roll", "Overprotected", and "I'm Not a Girl, Not Yet a Woman"; however, the soundtrack does not include the original versions of any of these tracks and they were instead included on the singer's third studio album Britney (2001), which also was promoted as the movie's soundtrack.

The album opens with a karaoke version of "I Love Rock 'n' Roll", which was first performed by the Arrows in 1975 and covered by Spears for Crossroads. In addition to a remix of "Overprotected" performed by Spears, the album also features tracks by Mystikal, Matthew Sweet, Jars of Clay and Bowling for Soup.

== Track listing ==
Crossroads (Music from the Major Motion Picture) (2002)
No.	Title	Writer(s)	Performer(s)	Length
1.	"I Love Rock 'n' Roll" (karaoke sing-along version)	Alan Merrill, Jake Hooker	Britney Spears	3:06
2.	"Shake It Fast"	Michael Tyler, Pharrell Williams, Chad Hugo	Mystikal	4:15
3.	"Girlfriend"	Matthew Sweet	Matthew Sweet	3:40
4.	"Unforgetful You"	Jars of Clay	Jars of Clay	3:20
5.	"Greatest Day"	Jaret Reddick	Bowling for Soup	3:14
6.	"Overprotected" (JS16 Remix)	Max Martin, Rami Yacoub	Britney Spears	6:07
Total length:				23:42

== Credits and personnel ==
Credits adapted from CD liner notes:

- Performers – Britney Spears, Mystikal, Matthew Sweet, Jars of Clay, Bowling for Soup
- Songwriters – Alan Merrill, Jake Hooker, Michael Tyler, Pharrell Williams, Chad Hugo, Matthew Sweet, Jars of Clay, Jaret Reddick, Max Martin, Rami Yacoub
- Producers – Rodney Jerkins, the Neptunes, Fred Maher, Matthew Sweet, Dennis Herring, Jaret Reddick, Max Martin, Rami Yacoub
- Remixer – JS16
- Audio mastering – Tom Coyne

== Crossroads: Special Edition ==
Crossroads: Special Edition

Soundtrack album by various artists
- Released: October 20, 2023
- Genre: Pop
- Length: 68:00
- Label: RCA
- Producers: Rodney Jerkins; The Neptunes; Fred Maher; Matthew Sweet; Dennis Herring; Jaret Reddick; Max Martin; Rami Yacoub

Crossroads: Special Edition is the expanded reissue of the soundtrack. It was released on October 20, 2023, by RCA Records, to accompany the film's theatrical re-release five days later. Unlike the original soundtrack, the release includes Spears' three singles which were featured in the film: "I Love Rock 'n' Roll", "Overprotected", and "I'm Not a Girl, Not Yet a Woman". It also includes tracks by Shania Twain, A Flock of Seagulls, the Cult, Cypress Hill, Nikka Costa, Marvin Gaye and Sheryl Crow amongst others. The album closes with three remixes of Spears' tracks.

=== Track listing ===
Crossroads: Special Edition
No.	Title	Writer(s)	Performer(s)	Length
1.	"I'm Not a Girl, Not Yet a Woman"	Max Martin; Rami Yacoub; Dido Armstrong	Britney Spears	3:51
2.	"Overprotected" (Richi Lopez Remix)	Martin; Yacoub	Spears	3:23
3.	"I Love Rock 'n' Roll"	Alan Merrill; Jake Hooker	Spears	3:06
4.	"I Ran (So Far Away)"	Mike Score; Ali Score; Frank Maudsley; Paul Reynolds	A Flock Of Seagulls	5:05
5.	"Girlfriend"	Matthew Sweet	Sweet	3:40
6.	"Greatest Day"	Jaret Reddick	Bowling for Soup	3:14
7.	"Man! I Feel Like a Woman!"	Shania Twain; Robert John "Mutt" Lange	Twain	3:53
8.	"Rise"	Ian Astbury; Billy Duffy	The Cult	3:39
9.	"How I Could Just Kill a Man"	Louis Freese; Lowell Fulson; Jimmy McCracklin; Lawrence Muggerud; Senen Reyes	Cypress Hill	4:09
10.	"So Have I for You"	Nikka Costa; Stanley; Michael "Mike D" Diamond; Adam "Ad-Rock" Horovitz; Adam "MCA" Yauch; John King; Michael Simpson; Matt Dike	Costa	5:10
11.	"Let's Get It On"	Marvin Gaye; Ed Townsend	Gaye	4:52
12.	"If It Makes You Happy"	Sheryl Crow; Jeff Trott	Crow	5:24
13.	"Unforgetful You"	Jars of Clay	Jars of Clay	3:20
14.	"Suckerpunch"	Jaret Reddick	Bowling for Soup	3:19
15.	"I Love Rock 'n' Roll" (Frank Walker Remix)	Merrill; Hooker	Spears	2:54
16.	"I'm Not a Girl, Not Yet a Woman" (Snakehips Remix)	Martin; Yacoub; Armstrong	Spears	2:47
17.	"Overprotected" (JS16 Remix)	Martin; Yacoub	Spears	6:07
Total length:				68:00

== See also ==
- Britney (2001), Spears' third studio album
