= Overprotection =

Overprotection may refer to:

- Overprotection, a strategy in chess
- Helicopter parent

== See also ==
- "Overprotected", a song by Britney Spears
