= MTV Movie Award for Best Dressed =

This is a following list for the MTV Movie Award winners for Best Dressed. The award was first introduced in 2001. It was last given out in 2002.

Year	Actor Movie	Nominated
2001	Jennifer Lopez –The Cell	Kate Hudson - Almost Famous; Elizabeth Hurley - Bedazzled; Samuel L. Jackson - Shaft; Lucy Liu - Charlie's Angels
2002	Reese Witherspoon –Legally Blonde	Thora Birch - Ghost World; George Clooney - Ocean's Eleven; Will Ferrell - Zoolander; Britney Spears - Crossroads; Ben Stiller - Zoolander
