= Crossroads (2002 film) =

2002 film by Tamra Davis

- Theatrical release poster
- Directed by: Tamra Davis
- Screenplay by: Shonda Rhimes
- Story by: Britney Spears
- Produced by: Ann Carli
- Starring: Britney Spears; Anson Mount; Zoe Saldaña; Taryn Manning; Kim Cattrall; Dan Aykroyd
- Cinematography: Eric Alan Edwards
- Edited by: Melissa Kent
- Music by: Trevor Jones
- Production companies: MTV Films; Zomba Films
- Distributed by: Paramount Pictures (United States); Summit Entertainment (International)
- Release date: February 15, 2002
- Running time: 93 minutes
- Country: United States
- Language: English
- Budget: $10–12 million
- Box office: $61.7 million

Crossroads is a 2002 American teen comedy-drama film directed by Tamra Davis, from a screenplay by Shonda Rhimes. The film stars Britney Spears, Anson Mount, Zoe Saldaña, Taryn Manning, Kim Cattrall, and Dan Aykroyd. Set in Georgia, its plot centers on three teenage girls on a cross-country road trip, as they find themselves and their friendship in the process.

Development began in late 2000 when Spears created a concept that was later expanded by Rhimes. Principal filming began in March 2001, and encompassed over six months. Crossroads was produced by MTV Films and released on February 15, 2002, in North America by Paramount Pictures, and was a box office success, grossing $61.7 million worldwide on a $10‒12 million budget. The film received unfavorable reviews from critics, though Spears' performance was praised. Spears's third studio album Britney (2001) was promoted as the soundtrack to the film, in addition to Crossroads (Music from the Major Motion Picture).

As part of a promotional campaign for Spears' memoir The Woman in Me, the movie was acquired by Sony Music Entertainment (via RCA Records label, current holders of the former Zomba Recording Corporation / Jive Records' catalogue) who re-released it to theaters on October 23 and 25, 2023, alongside a special edition of the soundtrack.

== Plot ==
As children growing up in a small Georgia town, Lucy, Kit, and Mimi bury a "wish box" and vow to dig it up on the night of their high school graduation. However, as the trio grows up, their friendship fades: Lucy becomes the introverted valedictorian, Kit becomes the most popular girl in school, and Mimi becomes an outcast from the trailer park facing teenage pregnancy.

On the night of graduation, they reunite to dig up the "wish box", remembering their old wishes: Kit wanted to get married, Lucy wanted to find her mother who abandoned her, and Mimi wanted to travel to California. Lucy and Kit try to convince Mimi, who is five months pregnant, not to go to Los Angeles to audition for a record company. Lucy's secret dream was being a singer like Kit and her father wanted her go to medical school. However, they decide to go with her to Los Angeles the next morning. Kit is going to see her fiancé who is a student at University of California, Los Angeles (UCLA), and Lucy is going to find her mother in Tucson, Arizona.

Unbeknownst to her overbearing father Pete, Lucy, Kit, and Mimi depart in a yellow 1972 Buick Skylark convertible with Mimi's friend Ben. During the trip, the car breaks down in Louisiana and, with little money, Mimi suggests that they sing karaoke at a New Orleans bar for tips. At the bar, Mimi develops stage fright and is unable to sing. Lucy takes her place and is a hit, and the girls earn enough money to fix the car and continue on their way.

While staying at a motel in Alabama, Kit tells Lucy and Mimi that she heard a rumor about Ben going to jail for killing a guy. Uneasy for most of the trip, the girls finally confront Ben about the rumor, who reveals that he actually went to jail for driving his stepsister across state lines without parental consent because his stepfather was abusing her. Lucy and Ben fall in love with each other, and the girls have their first honest conversation since they were children: Lucy reveals that her mother left her and her father when she was three years old, but believes that her mother wants to see her again. Kit, who was overweight as a child, reveals that her mother sent her to "fat camp" every summer until she reached her goal weight. Mimi mentions that her baby's father is not her ex-boyfriend Kurt, but a man who raped her at a party, and that she is planning to put her baby up for adoption.

In Tucson, Lucy finds her mother Caroline, who has remarried with two young sons and is unhappy to see her. Caroline reveals that Lucy was an unintended pregnancy and that she wants nothing to do with her, leaving Lucy heartbroken. At the motel, Ben consoles Lucy and impresses her by writing music to a poem she has written during the trip. Lucy then rejoins Kit, Mimi, and Ben, and they reach Los Angeles.

One night, Kit takes Mimi with her to surprise her fiancé Dylan. Alone together in the motel, Lucy loses her virginity to Ben. Kit and Mimi arrive at Dylan's apartment to find him cheating on Kit with another woman. She then realizes that it was Dylan who raped Mimi, and punches him in the face. While running away, Mimi falls down the stairs and loses her baby. In the hospital, Lucy and Kit console her as she comes to terms with her loss, having decided to keep her baby once they reached Los Angeles.

Lucy calls her father to come take her, Kit, and Mimi back home, and Kit and Mimi tell her that she should go to the audition in Mimi's place. Lucy declines and prepares to leave with them and her father, but realizes that everything she has done has been to please her father instead of herself. Lucy tells her father to let her go, runs to Ben, and they kiss. She, Kit, and Mimi head to the audition with Ben and receive a standing ovation for their performance of her song, "I'm Not a Girl, Not Yet a Woman". The girls re-bury the "wish box" at a Los Angeles beach, deciding not to make any wishes for the future, but to focus on the present and their friendship.

== Cast ==
- Britney Spears as Lucy Wagner
  - Jamie Lynn Spears as young Lucy
- Anson Mount as Ben Kimble
- Zoë Saldana as Kit
  - Dajiné Colón as young Kit
- Taryn Manning as Mimi
  - Crystal Milton as young Mimi
- Kim Cattrall as Caroline
- Dan Aykroyd as Pete Wagner
- Beverly Johnson as Kit's mother
- Justin Long as Henry
- Bahni Turpin as Ms. Jenson
- Kool Moe Dee as a bar owner
- David "Gruber" Allen as a bar patron
- Jesse Camp as an audition applicant

== Production ==
In early 2001, Spears said that she had plans to make her film debut. She and her team then created a concept for it, which was later developed by Grey's Anatomy creator Shonda Rhimes. Spears commented that she "talked to [Rhimes] and told her what I wanted the movie to be about and she elaborated on it. It was my little project. When you do a movie, I think you have to be really passionate about it. I was having a lot of offers, but this is something my heart was into." A press conference was held during the Marché International du Disque et de l'Edition Musicale (MIDEM) in Cannes, France, on January 19, 2002, where Spears also premiered the film.

Filming for Crossroads initiated in March 2001 in New Orleans, Metairie, Baton Rouge, and Tangipahoa Parish, Louisiana, near Spears' hometown. Due to the fact that Spears was also recording her third studio album along with the film's production, filming wrapped up after only six months. Additional scenes were filmed in Los Angeles County, California. Crossroads had a total budget of $12 million; a relatively low budget by industry standards. According to the Louisiana Film and Video Commission, the film was originally titled What Friends Are For. Spears described it as a teen movie that deals with real issues that normal teenagers live on a daily basis. She continued to explain the film's content, saying that it "is about this journey that the three of us best friends take, finding ourselves and what we want out of life and getting our friendship back. Friends are all you have at the end of the day. When your boyfriend breaks up with you, who do you call? Your girlfriend. I just love that message."

Justin Long, who plays one of Lucy's best friends from high school, thought that Crossroads is "like a road trip buddy movie for girls." Long also said that he was impressed by Spears' work ethic, commenting that "she could not have been more down to earth. She's the sweetest girl. After 10 minutes, I forgot she was a big pop star." Anson Mount revealed that before he took the role of Ben, he was on the set of the film City by the Sea with actor Robert De Niro. De Niro saw Mount with the Crossroads script and encouraged Mount to take the role, running a few of Spears' lines with him.

== Reception ==
=== Box office ===
Crossroads was released in the United States on February 15, 2002. On its opening day, Crossroads grossed an estimated $5.2 million in 2,380 theaters, becoming the second highest-grossing film of the day. On the first weekend of its release, Crossroads placed second behind John Q., grossing an estimate of $14,527,187. By the second week, the film dropped a 52% on tickets sales, ranking at number five at the box office. Crossroads was a moderate financial success, grossing a total $37,191,304 in the United States. Worldwide, the film grossed a total of $61,141,030 until its close day, on May 9, 2002.

=== Critical response ===
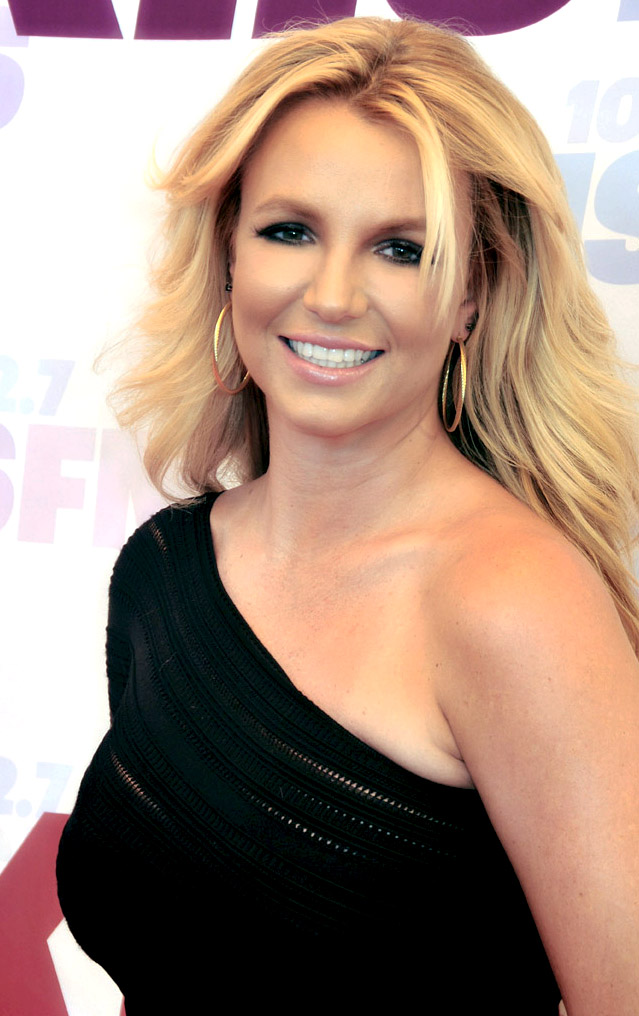
Despite the film's negative reception, Spears' performance was praised. She was nominated for two MTV Movie Awards and three Teen Choice Awards.

On Rotten Tomatoes, the film has a 15% approval rating based on 103 reviews, with an average rating of 4.10/10, with the consensus: "A cliched and silly pop star vanity project, Crossroads is strictly for Britney fans only." Metacritic, which assigns a weighted average score, gave the film a 27 out of 100 based on 31 reviews from critics, indicating "generally unfavorable" reviews. Audiences surveyed by CinemaScore gave the film a grade "B" on scale of A to F.

John Anderson of Los Angeles Times commented "Spears acquits herself as well as anyone might, in a movie as contrived and lazy as this one". Chris Kaltenbach of The Baltimore Sun said, "go see Crossroads if you want to hear Britney sing or see her wear next-to-nothing. But otherwise, avoid this train wreck at all costs". Lisa Schwarzbaum of Entertainment Weekly gave the film a positive review, commenting Crossroads "not only makes excellent use of the singer's sweetly coltish acting abilities, but it also promotes a standardized set of sturdy values with none of Mariah Carey's desperate Glitter, or any of Mandy Moore's gummy pap in A Walk to Remember". Jane Crowther of BBC rated the film 3 out of 5 stars, applauded Cattrall and Aykroyd's interactions with the characters, and said that "Spears manages to come across on film as natural, endearing, and extremely likable".

Robert K. Elder of the Chicago Tribune said "Spears delivers a performance with the same sincerity she invests into a Pepsi commercial, only this film contains twice the sugary calories", while New York Daily News writer Elizabeth Weitzman noted, "Here's what Crossroads does not have: Cohesive direction from Tamra Davis, intelligent dialogue, a comprehensible plot". Maitland McDonagh of TV Guide commented that "the film's mealy-mouthed messages about feminine empowerment will almost certainly fall on deaf ears, since even 11-year-olds know Spears's power resides largely in her taut torso". Claudia Puig of USA Today considered it "less a movie than a mind-numbingly dull road trip", while The Washington Post reporter Ann Hornaday said, "not a music video, not yet a movie, but more like an extended-play advertisement for the Product that is Britney".

Jane Dark of Village Voice compared Crossroads to Mariah Carey's Glitter, saying, "You spend a lot of time wondering, 'Better or worse than Glitter?' You think if the projectionist cranked the volume a little you could actually sort of get into this". The film was criticized for not promoting safe sex, to which Spears responded: "I think by the time my character, Lucy, decides to make love in the film the audience realizes she's responsible enough and hopefully did do that. There was a scene where I took a box of condoms out but they took that scene out because the movie was too long." In 2010, Time named it one of the top 10 worst chick flicks.

=== Critical reevaluation ===
In the years following its release, Crossroads has been reassessed more favorably by several critics and publications. In October 2023, Rolling Stone published an article titled "Britney Spears' Crossroads Is a Lost Classic," highlighting the film's enduring appeal and cultural significance. The piece emphasized the film's themes of female friendship and empowerment, noting that it has gained recognition as a "lost classic" over time. The article also praised Britney Spears's performance, describing her as "absolutely breathtaking to watch," and commended the film for its portrayal of complicated female characters, reflecting early expertise in writing such roles. Writing for Time in 2023, Stephanie Zacharek praised Britney Spears’s performance as “much better than she herself probably thinks it is,” highlighting moments where the singer “comes off as fully relaxed and alive.” Vanity Fair noted that although the film “initially received poor reviews,” it is now “being reevaluated in a more favorable light,” emphasizing its female-driven creative team and themes of friendship and empowerment. Business Insider similarly reported that director Tamra Davis believes the film “deserves a second look,” pointing to how early criticism was shaped by gendered biases in media coverage of Spears and her work. In a 2022 reflection for the CBC, journalist Amil Niazi wrote that she had expected the film to be “a shallow hate-watch,” but was surprised by how “invested [she] found [herself] in the characters” and how much she “rooted for them,” calling it a sincere story of friendship rather than a disposable pop-star vanity project.

In 2021, Pamela Hutchinson wrote a critical reassessment in The Guardian, noting that prior negative reviews had "recoiled at the film's savvy as a star vehicle – the way it builds up and reinforces Spears's commercial persona, from her virginity to her work ethic." Hutchinson argued "Crossroads was designed to represent what Britney Spears meant to her young fans, a hand to hold through the minefield of growing up. That's why her endearing earnestness shines through every deliberately unironic scene."

=== Accolades ===
Group	Category	Recipient	Result
MTV Movie Awards	Best Female Breakthrough Performance	Britney Spears	Nominated
MTV Movie Awards	Best Dressed	Britney Spears	Nominated
Teen Choice Awards	Choice Drama Movie Actress	Britney Spears	Nominated
Teen Choice Awards	Choice Breakout Movie Actress	Britney Spears	Nominated
Teen Choice Awards	Choice Movie Chemistry	Britney Spears and Anson Mount	Nominated
Golden Raspberry Awards	Most Flatulent Teen-Targeted Movie	Crossroads	Nominated
Golden Raspberry Awards	Worst Actress	Britney Spears	Won
Golden Raspberry Awards	Worst Director	Tamra Davis	Nominated
Golden Raspberry Awards	Worst Original Song	"I'm Not a Girl, Not Yet a Woman"	Won
Golden Raspberry Awards	Worst Original Song	"Overprotected"	Nominated
Golden Raspberry Awards	Worst Picture	Paramount Home Entertainment	Nominated
Golden Raspberry Awards	Worst Screen Couple	Britney Spears and Anson Mount	Nominated
Golden Raspberry Awards	Worst Screenplay	Shonda Rhimes	Nominated
Stinkers Bad Movie Awards	Worst Actress	Britney Spears	Nominated
Stinkers Bad Movie Awards	Worst Original Song	"I'm Not a Girl, Not Yet a Woman"	Nominated
Stinkers Bad Movie Awards	Worst On Screen Couple	Britney Spears and Anson Mount	Nominated
Stinkers Bad Movie Awards	Worst Fake Accent – Male	Dan Aykroyd	Nominated

=== Home media ===
Crossroads was released on VHS and DVD on July 23, 2002. It is out of print and has yet to be released as a Blu-ray version, or a DVD re-release.

In October 2023, the film's director, Tamra Davis, confirmed that Sony Music Entertainment had acquired the film's distribution rights back from Paramount Pictures. Later, it was reported that Netflix had purchased worldwide streaming rights for the film and was made available to watch on February 15, 2024.

== Soundtrack ==
Crossroads (Music from the Major Motion Picture) features two songs by Spears: a karaoke version of her cover version of "I Love Rock 'n' Roll" and a remix of "Overprotected" by JS16. The release also includes tracks by Mystikal, Matthew Sweet, Jars of Clay and Bowling for Soup. A new, expanded version of the soundtrack was released in October 2023, which accompanied the film's theatrical rerelease. Spears's third studio album Britney (2001) contains three tracks that were used in Crossroads: "I Love Rock 'n' Roll", "Overprotected", and "I'm Not a Girl, Not Yet a Woman". Britney was also promoted as the soundtrack to the movie.

== Bibliography ==
- Spears, Britney; Culotta, Felicia (2002). Britney Spears' Crossroads Diary. Scholastic, Inc. ISBN 978-0-4393-9745-2.
