= MuchMusic Video Award for Peoples Choice: Favourite International Artist =

Award

The Peoples Choice: Favorite International Artist is a defunct award, formerly presented at the MuchMusic Video Awards. The award was only presented to an artist or group that was not from Canada. For the 2008 MuchMusic Video Awards, the award was changed to People's Choice: Favourite International Video, a more general award including international group artists as well as international solo artists.

== Winners ==
Year	Artist	Ref.
2008	Fall Out Boy	
2009	Jonas Brothers	
2010	Adam Lambert	
2011	Lady Gaga	
2012	Katy Perry	
2013	Taylor Swift	
2014	Selena Gomez	
