= Hammond Square =

Shopping mall in Hammond, Louisiana

- Location: Hammond, Louisiana, United States
- Coordinates: 30.4818°N 90.4601°W
- Address: 411 Palace Drive
- Opened: 1977; 49 years ago
- Developer: Sizeler Realty
- Owner: Palace Properties, LLC
- Architect: HKW Associates
- Num. of stores: 100
- Floor area: 900,000 sq ft (84,000 m^{2})
- Website: Hammond Square

Hammond Square, formerly Hammond Square Mall, is a shopping mall in Hammond, Louisiana, United States. Originally built as an enclosed mall in 1977, it was extensively renovated into an outdoor lifestyle center between 2007 and 2009 after a period of decline. Major tenants of the mall include JCPenney, Dillard's, and Target.

== History ==
Sizeler Realty built Hammond Square Mall in 1977. The center's original anchor stores were D. H. Holmes (sold to Dillard's in 1989) and Sears, with JCPenney being added on in 1979. At its peak, the mall consisted of more than 75 stores and 540,000 square feet (50,000 m^{2}) of retail space.

After a period of decline, Stirling Properties bought the mall in 2007 and announced renovation plans. Under these plans, the enclosed mall was shuttered entirely on March 31, 2007 save for the locations of Dillard's, Sears, and Rite Aid. The rest of the mall would then be demolished for a new outdoor complex featuring a new JCPenney store along with Target and other small retailers. Renovations were completed in October 2009, and Sterling Properties held a grand opening ceremony lasting from October 1 to October 4. Renamed to just Hammond Square, the new shopping center featured Best Buy, TJ Maxx, and Books-A-Million as well.

== Achievements ==
- Greater Hammond Chamber of Commerce: Link Award Committee (2009)
- United States Design and Development Awards (2010)
- South Central Construction Magazine’s: Mall of the Year (2010)
- McGraw Hill Construction Company: Award of Merit (2010)
