= I'm Not a Girl, Not Yet a Woman =

2002 single by Britney Spears

Single by Britney Spears

from the album Britney
- B-side: "I Run Away"
- Released: January 7, 2002
- Recorded: May–June 20, 2001
- Studio: Maratone (Stockholm); Battery (New York City)
- Genre: Pop; ballad
- Length: 3:52
- Label: Jive
- Songwriters: Max Martin; Rami Yacoub; Dido Armstrong
- Producers: Max Martin; Rami

Britney Spears singles chronology
"Overprotected" (2001)	"I'm Not a Girl, Not Yet a Woman" (2002)	"I Love Rock 'n' Roll" (2002)

Music video
- "I'm Not a Girl, Not Yet a Woman" on YouTube

"I'm Not a Girl, Not Yet a Woman" is a song by American singer Britney Spears from her third studio album, Britney (2001). It was written and produced by Max Martin and Rami, with additional writing from Dido. The song was released as the second US and third international single from Britney on January 7, 2002, by Jive Records. "I'm Not a Girl, Not Yet a Woman" is a song that speaks about the angst and heartache of adolescence. Spears considered the song inspirational and one of her favorite songs to perform.

"I'm Not a Girl, Not Yet a Woman" received positive reviews from music critics. The song was considered to be Spears' standout statement on Britney, and was likened to the powerful ballads written by Diane Warren. However, it won the Golden Raspberry Award for Worst Original Song due to the film that it was paired up with. While the song did not perform well in the United States, "I'm Not a Girl, Not Yet a Woman" reached the top ten in Australia, Germany, Ireland, Sweden and United Kingdom. An accompanying music video for the song was filmed at Antelope Canyon in Page, Arizona and directed by Wayne Isham, being released along with Crossroads (2002), Spears' first film as a protagonist. Spears performed "I'm Not a Girl, Not Yet a Woman" as part of her Dream Within a Dream Tour, and on several TV and award shows.

== Background ==
In early 2001, Spears and her team developed a script for a movie where the singer could be the main role. "I talked to Rhimes and told her what I wanted the movie to be about and she elaborated on it," Spears said. "It was my little project. When you do a movie, I think you have to be really passionate about it. I was having a lot of offers, but this is something my heart was into." After finishing the script, the movie, which was later titled Crossroads, had the working titles of What Are Friends For and Not a Girl. "I'm Not a Girl, Not Yet a Woman" was written by Dido, Max Martin and Rami. Though the song was recorded specifically for inclusion in the movie, it was also included on Spears's third studio album, Britney (2001).

== Composition ==
"I'm Not a Girl, Not Yet a Woman".
A sample from the song.

The song was produced and mixed by Max Martin and Rami Yacoub. Max Martin began working on the song at Maratone Studios in Stockholm, Sweden in mid-2001 and Spears recorded in June of the same year at Battery Studios in New York City, New York. The June 20, 2001, recording session aired on MTV Diary on September 1, 2001. Background vocals were provided by Martin and Jeanette Oison. Spears considered the song as one of her favorites, while praising Dido for her input into its songwriting, saying "it was truly an honor for you to be part of my album. Thanks for your input." "I'm Not a Girl, Not Yet a Woman" is a pop power ballad, founded on a strong piano melody, that lasts for three minutes and 49 seconds. The song is composed in the key of E♭ major and is set in time signature of common time, with a moderately slow tempo of 76 beats per minute. After the bridge, it transposes to F major. The song's lyrics talk about the angst and heartache that teenage girls suffer with puberty, where Spears claims, "I used to think I had the answers to everything." "I'm Not a Girl, Not Yet a Woman" has a basic sequence of E♭–A♭2–Fm7–B♭ as its chord progression.

== Reception ==
=== Critical ===
"I'm Not a Girl, Not Yet a Woman" received positive reviews from music critics. Yale Daily News writer Catherine Halaby called it a "well-executed ballad", while observing that "it comes across as a hybrid of advice to her young female fans on how to deal with puberty, and an explanation of her girly but not childlike attitude." Jim Farber of the Daily News while reviewing the Dream Within a Dream Tour, called the song "sugar pop dittie", along with Spears' previous ballad single "Don't Let Me Be the Last to Know". Nikki Tranker of PopMatters considered the song "Britney's standout statement on [Britney], [...] a power ballad that allows [the singer] to showcase her expert vocals while still adhering to the rules of safe pop." Tranker compared the song to powerful ballads written by Diane Warren.

Katie Perone of the Loyola Greyhound said the song "clearly defines the theme of the record: Britney's growing up, and wants to do her own thing." Nayer Nissim, from Pink News, called it "a bit wet and safe, but a standout vocal performance and Britney’s real connection with the lyrics elevates this". Shannon Barbour from Cosmopolitan called it Spears' 25th best song. Daniel Megarry from Gay Times classified it as a "soaring" ballad and wrote: "after two albums of girl-next-door visuals and bubblegum pop songs, Brit was ready to embrace adulthood [...] No song represents this better than 'I’m Not a Girl, Not Yet a Woman'". The staff from Entertainment Weekly placed it at number 30 on their ranking of Spears's songs and called it "her best introspection". Nicholas Hautman, from Us Weekly, deemed it a "somewhat cheesy yet introspective power ballad". Despite the positive response from critics, the song won a Golden Raspberry Award for Worst Original Song in 2003, due to being featured in Spears' film Crossroads (2002).

=== Commercial ===
"I'm Not a Girl, Not Yet a Woman" achieved moderate commercial success. The song did not make much impact in the United States, failing to reach the Billboard Hot 100, peaking at number two on the Billboard Bubbling Under Hot 100. However, the song did manage to peak at number 21 on the Billboard Pop Songs chart, and debuted in its peak position of number two in the United Kingdom, selling 40,000 copies. In Australia, the song peaked at number seven, and was certified gold by the Australian Recording Industry Association for selling over 30,000 physical units of the single. It also peaked inside the top ten in Austria, Germany, Ireland, and Sweden.

== Music video ==
The accompanying music video for the track was directed by Wayne Isham, who wanted to show Spears "out in nature". The video was filmed from August 16–17, 2001, on location in Arizona and Alstrom Point, Utah with none of the scenes shot on green screens. The video primarily consists of Spears, whilst wearing cowboy boots, performing the song whilst standing on the edge of a cliff, and inside a slot canyon: despite her "trepidation" and heavy winds which "almost dropped [her] over", she performed the scene without a safety cable. Isham praised Spears' attitude to the filming of the scene, claiming that she "had not a blink of fear" during the shoot, Spears is sitting on top of a cliff, surrounded by cliffs. Isham also considered the music video one of his favorites, commenting that he had "nothing but positive things to say about my experience with her and what she's doing right now" and that Spears "stepped into it with positive energy. She ended up stepping out and kicking ass." It premiered on MTV's Making the Video, on December 26, 2001. There are three versions of the video. The first and second versions has clips from the film Crossroads as well as additional scenes of Spears sitting at a bonfire and in a red motel room; the third version is the original version. The music video won the award for International Music Video of the Year Short-Form on the 2003 Japan Gold Disc Awards.

== Live performances ==
"I'm Not a Girl, Not Yet a Woman" was performed on Spears's Dream Within a Dream Tour. After the performance of "Boys", Spears sat down next to a piano player and talked to the audience before moving into a performance of the song. Spears also performed the song in several television appearances, including on The Rosie O'Donnell Show, the Late Show with David Letterman, the American Music Awards of 2002, The Oprah Winfrey Show, and Saturday Night Live. "I'm Not a Girl, Not Yet a Woman" was also performed on the show Wetten, dass..? in Germany and on The Tonight Show with Jay Leno. An MTV special titled Total Britney Live included an exclusive performance of the song, along with performances of "I'm a Slave 4 U" and "Stronger".

== Track listings ==
- European CD single
1. "I'm Not a Girl, Not Yet a Woman" (Album Version) – 3:53
2. "I Run Away" (Album Version) – 4:06
- European and Australian CD maxi single
1. "I'm Not a Girl, Not Yet a Woman" (Album Version) – 3:53
2. "I'm Not a Girl, Not Yet a Woman" (Spanish Fly Remix Radio Edit) – 3:29
3. "I'm Not a Girl, Not Yet a Woman" (Chocolate Puma Dub) – 7:37
4. "I Run Away" (Album Version) – 4:06
5. "Overprotected" (Video) – 3:54
6. "Crossroads US Movie Trailer" (Video) – 1:19
- Japanese CD maxi single
1. "I'm Not a Girl, Not Yet a Woman" (Album Version) – 3:53
2. "I'm Not a Girl, Not Yet a Woman" (Spanish Fly Remix Radio Edit) – 3:29
3. "I'm Not a Girl, Not Yet a Woman" (Chocolate Puma Dub) – 7:37
4. "I Run Away" (Album Version) – 4:06
- UK CD maxi single and cassette single
1. "I'm Not a Girl, Not Yet a Woman" (Album Version) – 3:53
2. "I'm Not a Girl, Not Yet a Woman" (Spanish Fly Remix Radio Edit) – 3:29
3. "I Run Away" (Album Version) – 4:06
- DVD single
1. "I'm Not a Girl, Not Yet a Woman" (Music Video)
2. "Crossroads" (Movie Preview)
3. "Live from Las Vegas" (Live Performance)
- 12-inch vinyl
1. "I'm Not a Girl, Not Yet a Woman" (Spanish Fly Club Mix) – 6:03
2. "I'm Not a Girl, Not Yet a Woman" (Spanish Fly Radio Edit) – 3:28
3. "I'm Not a Girl, Not Yet a Woman" (Chocolate Puma Mix) – 6:24
4. "I'm Not a Girl, Not Yet a Woman" (Album Version) – 3:51

== Credits and personnel ==
Credits are adapted from the liner notes of Britney.

- Britney Spears – lead vocals
- Dido Armstrong – songwriting
- Max Martin – songwriting, producer, mixing, background vocals
- Rami Yacoub – songwriting, producer, mixing
- Jeanette Olsson – background vocals
- Esbjörn Öhrwall – guitar, piano
- Tom Coyne – audio mastering

== Charts ==
=== Weekly charts ===
Weekly chart performance for "I'm Not a Girl, Not Yet a Woman"
Chart (2002)	Peak position
Australia (ARIA)	7
Austria (Ö3 Austria Top 40)	3
Belgium (Ultratop 50 Flanders)	22
Belgium (Ultratop 50 Wallonia)	26
Czech Republic (Rádio – Top 100)	4
Denmark (Tracklisten)	11
Eurochart Hot 100 (Music & Media)	2
European Radio Top 50 (Music & Media)	7
Finland (Suomen virallinen lista)	16
France (SNEP)	25
Germany (GfK)	10
Greece (IFPI)	21
Hungary (Single Top 40)	6
Ireland (IRMA)	3
Italy (FIMI)	16
Italy Airplay (Music & Media)	7
Japan (Oricon)	75
Netherlands (Dutch Top 40)	14
Netherlands (Single Top 100)	9
New Zealand (Recorded Music NZ)	40
Romania (Romanian Top 100)	20
Scottish Singles Sales (Official Charts)	2
Spain (Promusicae)	16
Sweden (Sverigetopplistan)	4
Switzerland (Schweizer Hitparade)	16
UK Singles (Official Charts)	2
UK Indie (Official Charts)	1
US Bubbling Under Hot 100 Singles (Billboard)	2
US Adult Contemporary (Billboard)	29
US Pop Airplay (Billboard)	21

=== Year-end charts ===
Year-end performance for "I'm Not a Girl, Not Yet a Woman"
Chart (2002)	Position
Australia (ARIA)	72
Austria (Ö3 Austria Top 40)	35
Eurochart Hot 100 (Music & Media)	66
European Radio Top 100 (Music & Media)	45
Germany (Media Control)	71
Ireland (IRMA)	31
Netherlands (Single Top 100)	79
Sweden (Hitlistan)	40
Switzerland (Schweizer Hitparade)	91
UK Singles (OCC)	82

== Certifications and sales ==
Certifications and sales for "I'm Not a Girl, Not Yet a Woman"
Region	Certification	Certified units/sales
Australia (ARIA)	Gold	35,000^{^}
France	—	34,256
United Kingdom (BPI)	Silver	200,000^{‡}
United States (RIAA)	Gold	500,000^{‡}
^{^} Shipments figures based on certification alone.^{‡} Sales+streaming figures based on certification alone.

== Release history ==
Release dates and formats for "I'm Not a Girl, Not Yet a Woman"
Region	Date	Format(s)	Label(s)	Ref.
United States	January 7, 2002	Contemporary hit radio	Jive	
Germany	February 18, 2002	Maxi CD	Rough Trade	
France	March 19, 2002	Maxi CD	Jive	
Australia	April 1, 2002	Maxi CD	Zomba	
United Kingdom	April 1, 2002	12-inch vinyl; cassette; maxi CD	Jive	
France	April 2, 2002	CD	Jive	
Japan	April 3, 2002	Maxi CD	Zomba	
Japan	April 17, 2002	DVD	Zomba	
