= Overprotected =

2001 single by Britney Spears

Single by Britney Spears

from the album Britney
- B-side: "I'm a Slave 4 U"
- Released: December 10, 2001
- Recorded: 2001
- Studio: Maratone (Stockholm)
- Genre: Dance-pop (main version); R&B (remix)
- Length: 3:18
- Label: Jive
- Songwriters: Max Martin; Rami
- Producers: Max Martin; Rami; Rodney "Darkchild" Jerkins (Note: Jerkins produced only The Darkchild Remix of "Overprotected".)

Britney Spears singles chronology
"I'm a Slave 4 U" (2001)	"Overprotected" (2001)	"I'm Not a Girl, Not Yet a Woman" (2002)

Music videos
- "Overprotected" on YouTube; "Overprotected" (Darkchild remix) on YouTube

"Overprotected" is a song by American singer Britney Spears from her third studio album, Britney (2001). It was written and produced by Max Martin and Rami. The song was released on December 10, 2001, by Jive Records as the second international single from Britney. "Overprotected" is a dance-pop song about a girl who is tired of being overprotected and just wants to be herself. The song received generally positive reviews from music critics. Its remixed R&B form, produced by Darkchild, was released as the third US single from Britney on April 2, 2002.

While it peaked only at number 86 on the US Billboard Hot 100, "Overprotected" peaked at number 22 in Canada and reached the top five in Italy, Romania, Sweden and the United Kingdom. An accompanying music video, directed by Billie Woodruff, portrays Spears dancing inside an abandoned factory; the music video for The Darkchild Remix, directed by Chris Applebaum, portrays Spears dancing and having fun with her friends. Spears has performed "Overprotected" a number of times, including during the Dream Within a Dream Tour (2001–2002) and The Onyx Hotel Tour (2004). In 2003, the song received a nomination for a Grammy Award for Best Female Pop Vocal Performance.

== Background ==
During the Oops!... I Did It Again Tour (2000), Spears discussed being inspired by hip hop artists such as Jay-Z and The Neptunes and the intention to create a record with a funkier sound. In February 2001, Spears signed a $7–8 million promotional deal with Pepsi, and released another book co-written with her mother Lynne Spears, entitled A Mother's Gift. The same month, Spears began recording her third studio album, with "Overprotected" being recorded at Maratone Studios in Stockholm, Sweden. Additional recording was done in April 2001 at Maratone in Sweden, in which the song's vocals were completed. Background vocals were provided by Spears and Bosslady, with the track being mixed by Max Martin and Rami at Maratone Studios. Her third studio album, Britney, was released in November 2001. In an interview with the Daily Record, Spears concluded she can relate to "Overprotected" "on a personal basis, because I feel kind of overprotected. When I want to go out, everything has to be organized in advance. I think that other kids of my age can relate to it to a certain extent."

== Composition ==
"Overprotected" (2001)
A 19-second sample of the song's chorus, featuring Spears singing over a dance-pop background with Europop influences.

"Overprotected" is a dance-pop song that lasts for three minutes and 18 seconds. David Browne of Entertainment Weekly noticed Europop influences on the song, while other critics compared it to previous songs released by Spears. According to the sheet music published at Musicnotes.com by Universal Music Publishing Group, "Overprotected" is composed in the key of C minor and is set in time signature of common time, with a moderate tempo of 96 beats per minute. Spears vocal range spans from A♭_{3} to C_{5}.

Lyrically, the track is about a girl who is tired of being manipulated by people around her and does not need to be told what to do, which is perceived in lines such as "You're gonna have to see through my perspective/ I need to make mistakes just to learn who I am/ And I don't want to be so damn protected". Dana Alice Heller, author of Makeover Television: Realities Remodelled (2007), said that, with "Overprotected", "Spears addresses the problem of being a teen star whose personal and professional are handled by others." She also compared "Overprotected" with the singer's first reality show, Britney and Kevin: Chaotic (2005), saying that "Britney frames her makeover as a move toward to independence, a rebellion against overly controlling parents and their stand-ins."

== Remixes ==
The song's main release in North America was a reworked R&B remix by Rodney "Darkchild" Jerkins. Jerkins said that the label "needed a remix that's crazy" and that the remix has "an old-school-type rhythm, which I think is kinda cool because it's an element [that Spears] never had, but I still gave it her edge. I was up all night rocking that joint. [It has the] same lyrics, I just reproduced the track." "The Darkchild Remix" was originally scheduled for release to radio stations in the United States in mid-March 2002; this date was pushed back and the song was released on April 1, 2002. The remix was heavily played in dance clubs, and Jerkins said he was not surprised with its popularity, stating "[Spears] reinvented herself. Everybody thought she was gonna come back with another 'Oops!... I Did It Again', but she went left and came with the 'I'm a Slave 4 U' joint, which is basically a club banger. You gotta big up people who reinvent themselves. I always said she was gonna be one of the people that's gonna be around for a minute, because I see that in her."

Finnish musician and record producer Jaakko Salovaara also created two remixes for the track, titled "JS16 Dub" and "JS16 Remix". The latter was included on the promotional soundtrack of Spears' film, Crossroads (2002).

== Critical reception ==
"In "Overprotected", her voice hovers between testiness and aggression. Good for her, you think, until you realize the Max Martin-produced track is pretty much the same stentorian Europop of her past records. Spears may proclaim she's not afraid to make a 'mistake', but the song is a study in risk management".

— Entertainment Weekly's David Browne review of the song.

Upon release, the track received generally positive reviews from music critics. Jocelyn Vena of MTV said that "with songs like 'Overprotected' and 'Let Me Be', Spears seemed to be letting out her adolescent angst", while Kyle Anderson of MTV Newsroom said, "the real first blush with emancipation from [the singer's] teen pop past came with ['Overprotected']". While reviewing Spears' third studio album Britney (2001), Stephen Thomas Erlewine of AllMusic said the track, along with "I'm Not a Girl, Not Yet a Woman" and "What It's Like to Be Me", "are pivotal moments on Britney Spears' third album, the record where she strives to deepen her persona (not the same thing as her character, of course), making it more adult while still recognizably Britney". Christopher Rosa, from Glamour, deemed it Spears' eight best song, and said that "feeling overly controlled or scrutinized is a consistent theme in Spears's discography, but this motif started with Overprotected", calling the song "introspection with a killer hook.

Critic Robert Christgau also considered "Overprotected" and "Cinderella" as the highlights of Britney, while saying, "hardly the first not-terribly-bright teenager to approach self-knowledge via the words of others". Nikki Tranker of PopMatters said the song "is an absolute belter reminiscent of Britney’s previous big-bang singles, 'Oops! I Did It Again' and 'You Drive Me Crazy' [sic]", while commenting that Spears "sings about ridding herself of the girlie chains around her, gripes about her need for space in the whirlwind that is her life, and lets us know she don’t need nobody telling her what to do". The staff from Entertainment Weekly placed it at number 24 on their ranking of Spears' songs and said that "there’s an eerie amount of foreshadowing for what was to come in her personal life. And Max Martin shows once again he had an unassailable gift for crafting that decade’s most indelible hooks". In 2003, the song received a Grammy nomination for Best Female Pop Vocal Performance at the 45th Annual Grammy Awards. Digital Spy's Alim Kheraj hailed it "an anthem that deals with the complexities of growing up and being held back by other people's perceptions [...] full of distinctive chord progressions and more hooks than it seems possible to include in one song".

== Chart performance ==
"Overprotected" attained commercial success in Europe. In France, it peaked at number 15, and was later certified Gold by the Syndicat National de l'Édition Phonographique (SNEP), for selling over 250,000 units of the single. In Sweden, the song reached number two, and was later certified Gold by the International Federation of the Phonographic Industry (IFPI), for selling over 15,000 units.

"Overprotected" reached number one in Mexico and was the best-selling single of 2002 in that country, also reached the top five in Italy, Romania, and United Kingdom, while reaching the top ten in Belgium (Flanders), Finland, Ireland, and Norway. In the United States, on the week of May 4, 2002, "The Darkchild Remix" peaked at number 86 on Billboard Hot 100, where it stayed on the chart for five weeks. It also entered on the Pop Songs chart, where it peaked at number 37 on the week of May 25, 2002, before dropping the chart in the following chart issue. In Canada, the song peaked at number 22 on the Canadian Hot 100.

== Music videos ==
=== Original version ===
The music video for "Overprotected" was directed by Billie Woodruff and produced under Geneva Films, while choreographed by Brian Friedman. In an interview with Harper's Bazaar in 2011, Spears recalled the music video, saying, "I just think it says a lot. It was directed so well, it was really colorful and the dancing was amazing". It begins with Spears driving away from the paparazzi, with a part of the instrumental version of the song "Bombastic Love", featured on the album Britney, playing. She makes her way into an alleyway and decides to enter an abandoned factory, hoping her pursuers will be thrown off course. When she enters the building she begins to dance her way around the warehouse. Spears' dancers, having spotted her walking into the factory, follow her inside. They find Spears dancing around and joke about it, before heading into a heavy dance routine. Towards the end of the video, segments of Spears in a room with walls covered in pictures and articles about herself are also shown. These walls move in and out before the video ends, signifying that she is "overprotected". At the end of the video, Britney walks to a wall, and exits the building. The music video was the number-one video of MTV Mexico in the final countdown of 2002 Los 100 Más Pedidos.

=== The Darkchild Remix ===
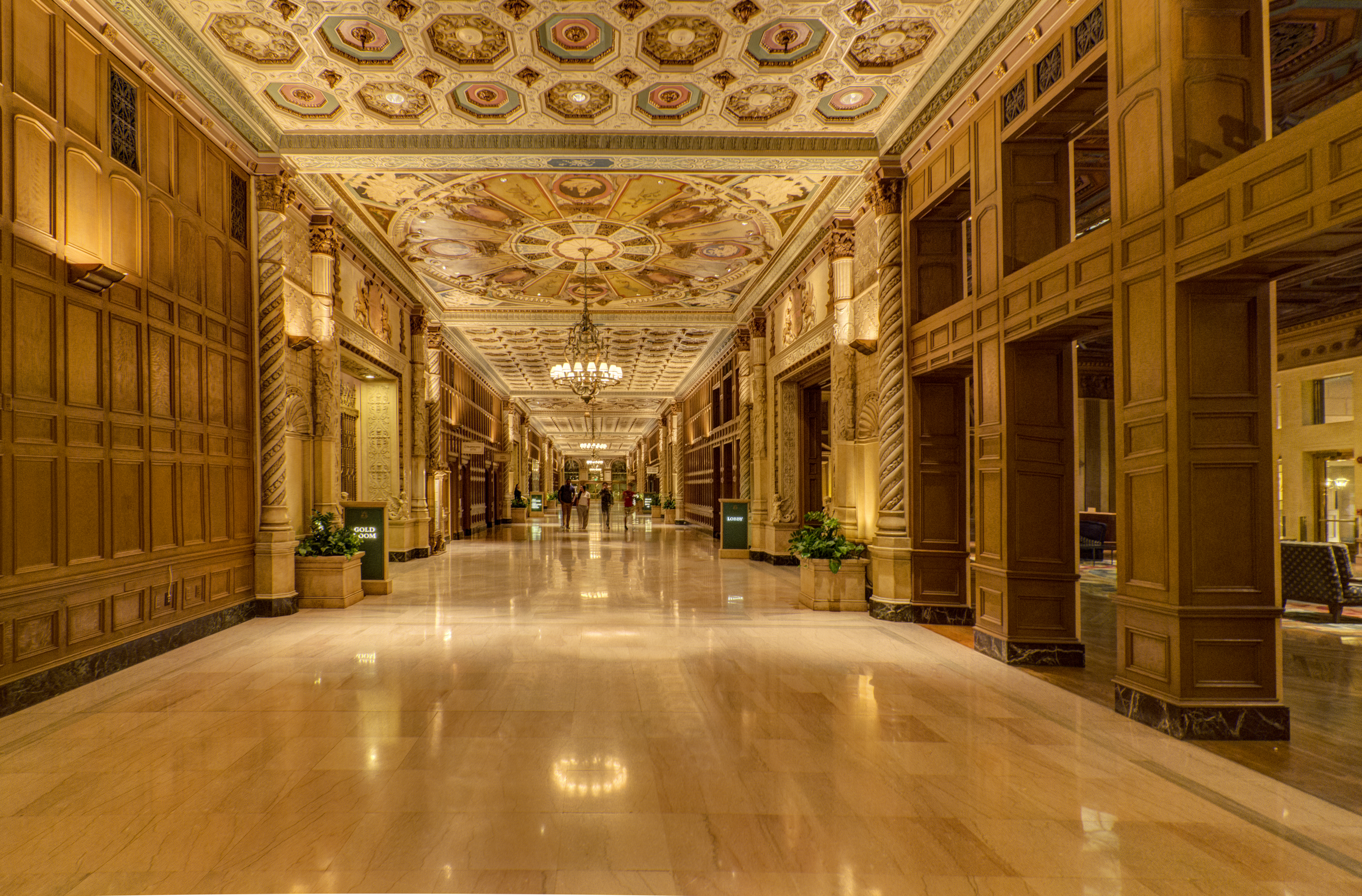
One of the hallways of the Biltmore Hotel, which was featured in the music video

The music video for "The Darkchild Remix" was directed by Chris Applebaum and filmed in the first weekend of March 2002 in Los Angeles, California. It was produced under A Band Apart Productions, while the choreography for this version was also created by Brian Friedman. The full shooting took 23 hours, and Applebaum was said to be impressed with Spears' "stamina and patience through the marathon shoot, which wrapped 5 a.m." According to Joe D'Angelo of MTV News, "the clip furthers her 'I'm Not a Girl, Not Yet a Woman' crusade to shirk her adolescent image, as she and five friends outsmart her bodyguard with the old 'you're wanted elsewhere' trick and sneak out of a hotel and into an underground dance club." It was released on March 26, 2002.

Spears directly referenced Janet Jackson's "Son of a Gun (I Betcha Think This Song Is About You)" in the scenes on the elevator and when she and her dancers walk down the hotel lobby. Both videos also use the same hotel setting, filmed at Los Angeles' Millennium Biltmore Hotel.

The video opens with Spears and her friends in a hotel room, where a tabloid reporter on television criticizes her for the sexy, revealing outfits she is often seen wearing publicly. Spears and her friends express their disagreement with the report. Spears, determined to be self-sufficient and unaffected by media comments, then makes a phone call to her bodyguard, and using a cloth to disguise the sound of her voice, coaxes him to leave the area so that her group may sneak out of the hotel and enjoy the day. They run into an elevator and fool around briefly with the security cameras before going up to the main lobby. A strut down the lobby of the hotel and a short dance sequence follows. As they leave the hotel, they follow towards the dance club. However, before they arrive, they are caught in an alley by several paparazzi, and start to perform a dance routine in the middle of the rain. As they make their entrance, they are dripping wet, an image which makes for more sensationalist fodder for the tabloid reporter.

== Live performances and usage in media ==
"Overprotected" was performed for the first time on 2001's Dream Within a Dream Tour. During the performance, Spears was dancing to the song surrounded by laser lights. The video backdrop showed images of a bald Spears, with her hair growing as the song went along. However, the backdrop was later removed for unknown reasons. After the announcement of the 2002 extension of the tour, some changes were made to the setlist, replacing the original mix of the song by "The Darkchild Remix". The remix was later performed on The Onyx Hotel Tour (2004), during the opening act, right after the performance of "Toxic". Spears' film, Crossroads (2002), features a performance of the song during the credits.

The song appears in the 2019 Max Martin jukebox musical & Juliet. The song appears in Act 1, where it is performed by François du Bois and Juliet Capulet.

John Early performs the song in his 2023 comedy special Now More Than Ever.

== Track listings ==
- Australian and New Zealand maxi CD
1. "Overprotected" (album version) – 3:21
2. "Overprotected" (JS16 remix) – 6:10
3. "Overprotected" (JS16 dub) – 5:28
4. "Exclusive Chat with Britney" – 6:14
5. "I'm a Slave 4 U" (album version) – 3:23
6. "I'm a Slave 4 U" (Thunderpuss radio mix) – 3:18
- European CD
1. "Overprotected" (album version) – 3:20
2. "Overprotected" (JS16 remix) – 6:10
- European, Thai, Israeli, and South Korean maxi CD
1. "Overprotected" (album version) – 3:21
2. "Overprotected" (JS16 remix) – 6:10
3. "Overprotected" (JS16 dub) – 5:28
4. "Exclusive Chat with Britney" – 6:14
5. "Crossroads U.S. Movie Trailer" (video) – 2:16
- French and European CD
1. "Overprotected" (album version) – 3:20
2. "Overprotected" (JS16 remix) – 6:10
3. "Crossroads U.S. Movie Trailer" (video) – 2:16
- Japanese maxi CD
1. "Overprotected" (album version) – 3:21
2. "Overprotected" (JS16 remix) – 6:10
3. "Overprotected" (JS16 dub) – 5:28
- UK cassette and maxi CD
1. "Overprotected" (album version) – 3:20
2. "Overprotected" (JS16 remix) – 6:10
3. "I'm a Slave 4 U" (Thunderpuss Mixshow edit) [the remix] – 6:17
- Digital download (digital 45)
1. "Overprotected" – 3:20
2. "Overprotected" (the Darkchild remix) – 3:19
- Digital download and streaming (Richi Lopez remix)
1. "Overprotected" (Richi Lopez remix) – 3:23

== Credits and personnel ==
Credits for "Overprotected" are adapted from Britney liner notes.

Technical

- Recorded and mixed at Maratone Studios in Stockholm, Sweden.
- Additional recording at Battery Studios in New York City, New York.

Personnel

- Britney Spears – lead and background vocals
- Max Martin – songwriting, production, mixing, guitar
- Rami Yacoub – songwriting, production, mixing
- Boss Lady – background vocals
- Rodney Jerkins – remixing
- Michel Tucker – Pro Tools engineer
- Daniel Savio – turntables

== Charts ==
=== Weekly charts ===
Weekly chart performance for "Overprotected"
Chart (2001–2002)	Peak position
Australia (ARIA)	16
Belgium (Ultratop 50 Flanders)	9
Belgium (Ultratop 50 Wallonia)	14
Canada (Nielsen SoundScan) The Darkchild Remix	22
Croatia (HRT)	7
Denmark (Tracklisten)	6
Eurochart Hot 100 (Music & Media)	8
Europe (European Radio Top 50)	12
Finland (Suomen virallinen lista)	7
France (SNEP)	15
Greece (IFPI)	6
Guatemala (Notimex)	3
Hungary Airplay (Music & Media)	7
Ireland (IRMA)	9
Italy (FIMI)	3
Italy Airplay (Music & Media)	5
Netherlands (Dutch Top 40)	15
Netherlands (Single Top 100)	12
Nicaragua (Notimex)	4
Norway (VG-lista)	9
Poland (ZPAV)	1
Romania (Romanian Top 100)	5
Scottish Singles Sales (Official Charts)	6
Spain (Promusicae)	14
Spain Airplay (Los 40 Principales)	1
Sweden (Sverigetopplistan)	2
UK Singles (Official Charts)	4
UK Indie (Official Charts)	1
US Billboard Hot 100 The Darkchild Remix	86
US Pop Airplay (Billboard) The Darkchild Remix	37

=== Year-end charts ===
Year-end chart performance for "Overprotected"
Chart (2002)	Position
Australia (ARIA)	89
Belgium (Ultratop 50 Flanders)	87
Belgium (Ultratop 50 Wallonia)	95
Canada (Nielsen SoundScan)	163
Eurochart Hot 100 (Music & Media)	61
European Radio Top 100 (Music & Media)	91
France (SNEP)	82
Ireland (IRMA)	85
Italy (FIMI)	49
Sweden (Hitlistan)	34
UK Singles (OCC)	85

== Certifications ==
Certifications for "Overprotected"
Region	Certification	Certified units/sales
Australia (ARIA)	Gold	35,000^{^}
France (SNEP)	Gold	250,000^{*}
Sweden (GLF)	Gold	15,000^{^}
United Kingdom (BPI)	Silver	200,000^{‡}
United States (RIAA)	Gold	500,000^{‡}
^{*} Sales figures based on certification alone.^{^} Shipments figures based on certification alone.^{‡} Sales+streaming figures based on certification alone.

== Release history ==
Release dates and formats for "Overprotected"
Region	Date	Format(s)	Version(s)	Label(s)	Ref.
Australia	December 10, 2001	Maxi CD	Original; JS16 Remix	Zomba	
Japan	December 12, 2001	Maxi CD	Original; JS16 Remix	Zomba	
Germany	January 21, 2002	Maxi CD	Original; JS16 Remix	Jive	
United Kingdom	January 21, 2002	Cassette; maxi CD	Original; JS16 Remix	Jive	
France	January 22, 2002	CD	Original; JS16 Remix	Jive	
France	January 29, 2002	Maxi CD	Original; JS16 Remix	Jive	
United States	April 1, 2002	Contemporary hit radio; rhythmic contemporary radio	The Darkchild Remix	Jive	
United States	April 2, 2002	12-inch vinyl	Original; The Darkchild Remix	Jive	
Various	October 20, 2023	Digital download; streaming	Richi Lopez Remix	RCA	

== Bibliography ==
- Heller, Dana Alice (2007). Makeover television: realities remodelled. I.B.Tauris. ISBN 978-1-84511-330-8.
- Hentges, Sarah (2006). Pictures of girlhood: modern female adolescence on film. McFarland. ISBN 978-0-7864-2402-3.
