= Cultural impact of Britney Spears =

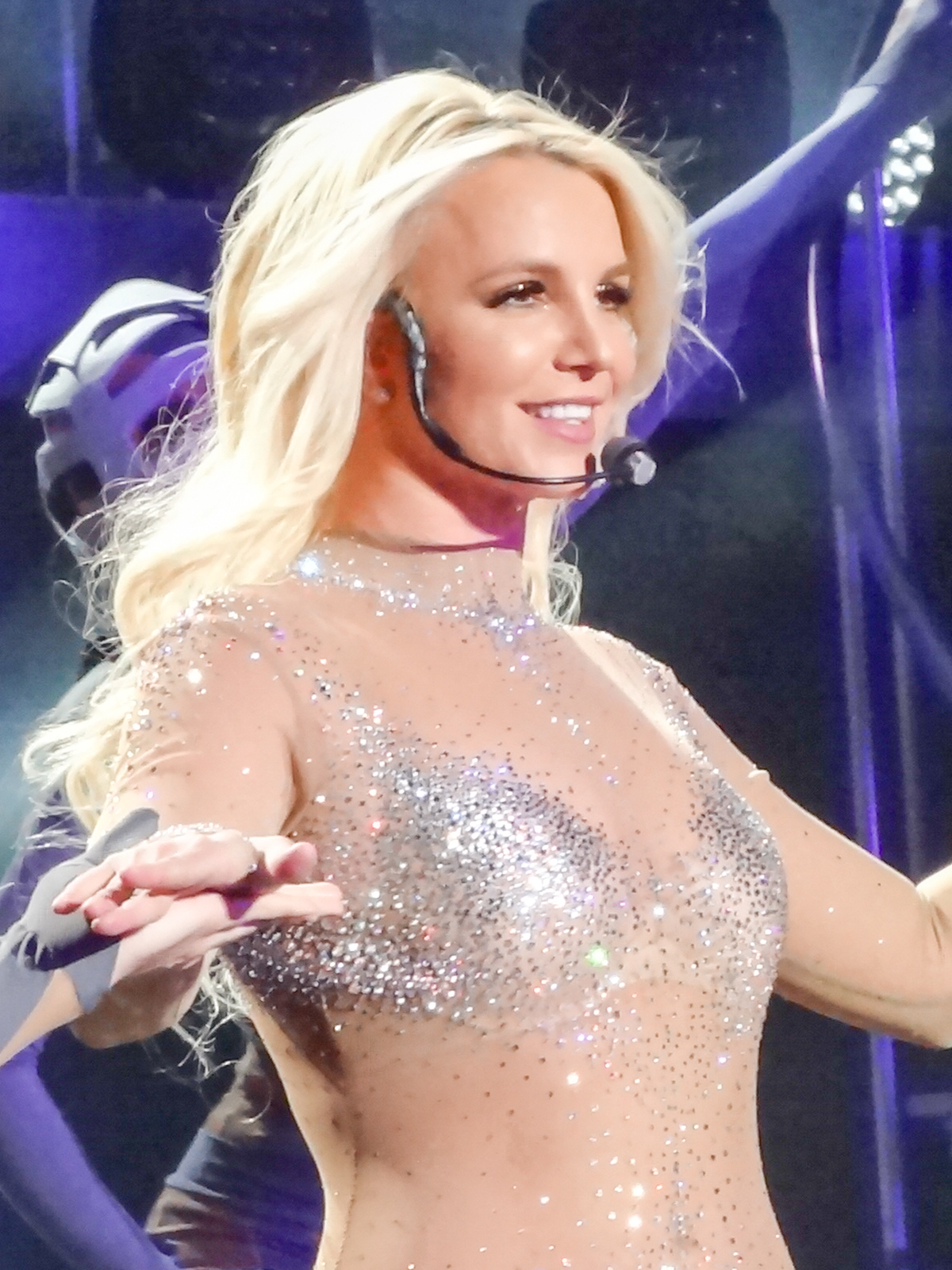
Spears performing in 2014 during her Las Vegas residency, Britney: Piece of Me

American singer Britney Spears, who debuted in 1998, has made a significant impact on the music, pop culture and fashion worlds with her artwork, performances, music videos and public image. Her recordings and product endorsements have been commercially successful worldwide, and her performance on the Billboard charts is a testament to her marketability. The media often refer to Britney Spears as the "Princess of Pop".

In 1998, Spears released her debut single "...Baby One More Time" and album of the same name the following year to worldwide success. Her influence ultimately shaped early 21st-century pop music and bubblegum pop— The song was widely well-received and stylistically influenced early 21st-century pop music. Spears's music videos have also played a significant role in shaping pop culture and being paid homage to by numerous artists and celebrities. In 2011, she received the MTV Video Vanguard Award, for her "outstanding contributions" and "profound impact" on music videos and pop culture.

Spears's music has had an impact on the LGBTQ+ community and culture. She publicly voiced her support for the DREAM Act on various platforms and donated to national charitable organizations to support the LGBTQ+ community. Spears' experience of reclaiming her freedom after enduring abuse resonated deeply with many in the gay community, earning her a devoted LGBTQ+ fan base. Her song Stronger also became an anthem of empowerment for a generation of LGBTQ+ individuals. In 1999, Spears opened up the Britney Spears Foundation which provided an opportunity to children in long-term hospitals to express themselves through performing. Spears also donated through the charity and raised money.

== Fame and stardom ==
Spears ranks among the world's highest-selling recording artists, having released nine studio albums and numerous singles. Academic views and journalistic opinions in the pop music industry sources have documented her significant influence on the music industry. Billboard critics positioned Spears at number six in their assessment of the greatest pop song artists in history.

Spears led the teen pop pack of Christina Aguilera, Jessica Simpson and Mandy Moore, who were all seen as "pop princesses" gaining chart success in 1999. These four performers had each been developing material in 1998, but Spears changed the market in late 1998 with "...Baby One More Time", opening the door for the others. Rolling Stone wrote that Spears "spearheaded the rise of post-millennial teen pop ... Spears early on cultivated a mixture of innocence and experience that generated lots of cash". Decades later, the designation "Princess of Pop" is often applied to Spears alone.

Critical evaluation has placed Spears among the prominent figures in pop music history.

=== Honorifics ===
Billboard ranked Spears eighth overall as one of the greatest artists of the 2000s decade, and the fifth female overall. She was ranked 58th on the list of the Greatest Artists of All Time.

In 2016, Spears was honored with the Billboard Millennium Award, which periodically recognize singers of great impact and influence in the music industry. She is one of the three artists to receive this achievement (alongside Beyoncé and Whitney Houston) and, as of 2024, the last person to receive this recognition.

In 2018, Spears was honored the GLAAD Vanguard Award by the GLAAD Media Awards for fair, accurate, and inclusive representations of LGBTQ people and issues.

== Commercial success ==
=== Billboard achievements ===
Spears has set numerous Billboard achievements, being named the top female artist of 1999 by the magazine. Billboard ranked her the 8th overall Artist of the Decade, and also recognized her as the best-selling female album artist of the 21st century's first decade, as well as the 5th overall. By the end of the 2000s decade, Billboard ranked Spears second on the Billboard 200 Artists Decade End Chart, behind Eminem, and 36th on the Billboard Hot 100 Artists Decade End. Billboard placed Spears 8th on 'The 100 Greatest Music Video Artists of All Time' and 6th on the 'Greatest Pop Stars of the 21st Century'. Billboard placed Spears as the ‘Greatest Pop Star By Year: 1981-2023’ for 1999.

Spears was also ranked 20th on the Greatest of All Time Top Dance Club Artists. In 2009, she was recognized as the 10th best-selling solo artist on Billboard. In 2011, Spears became the second artist in history to debut at number one with two or more songs on the Billboard Hot 100, ("3" and "Hold It Against Me").

Spears became the first new female artist to have a number-one single and number-one album on the Billboard 200 at the same time; and the first new artist (male or female) to have a single go to the number-one spot the same week that the album debuted at number-one. Spears is also the youngest female in Billboard's history to have a simultaneous single and album at number one in the same week, and became the fifth artist under the age of 18 to top the Billboard 200.

=== RIAA achievements ===
Additionally, the Recording Industry Association of America (RIAA) recognized Spears as the ninth best-selling female artist in the United States. Spears serves as one of the few artists in history to have a number-one single and studio album in each of the three decades of their career—1990s, 2000s, and 2010s.

Spears is one of the best-selling music artists of all time, selling over 150 million records worldwide.

In 2024, Spears became one of the few artists to have a platinum single in four consecutive decades.

Spears also became the 12th artist to have top-ten entries in four decades (1990s, 2000s, 2010s, and 2020s).

In the United States, Spears is the fourth best-selling female album artist of the Nielsen SoundScan era, as well as the best-selling female album artist of the 2000s. Before she turned 20 in 2001, Spears had sold over 37 million albums worldwide".

Other achievements

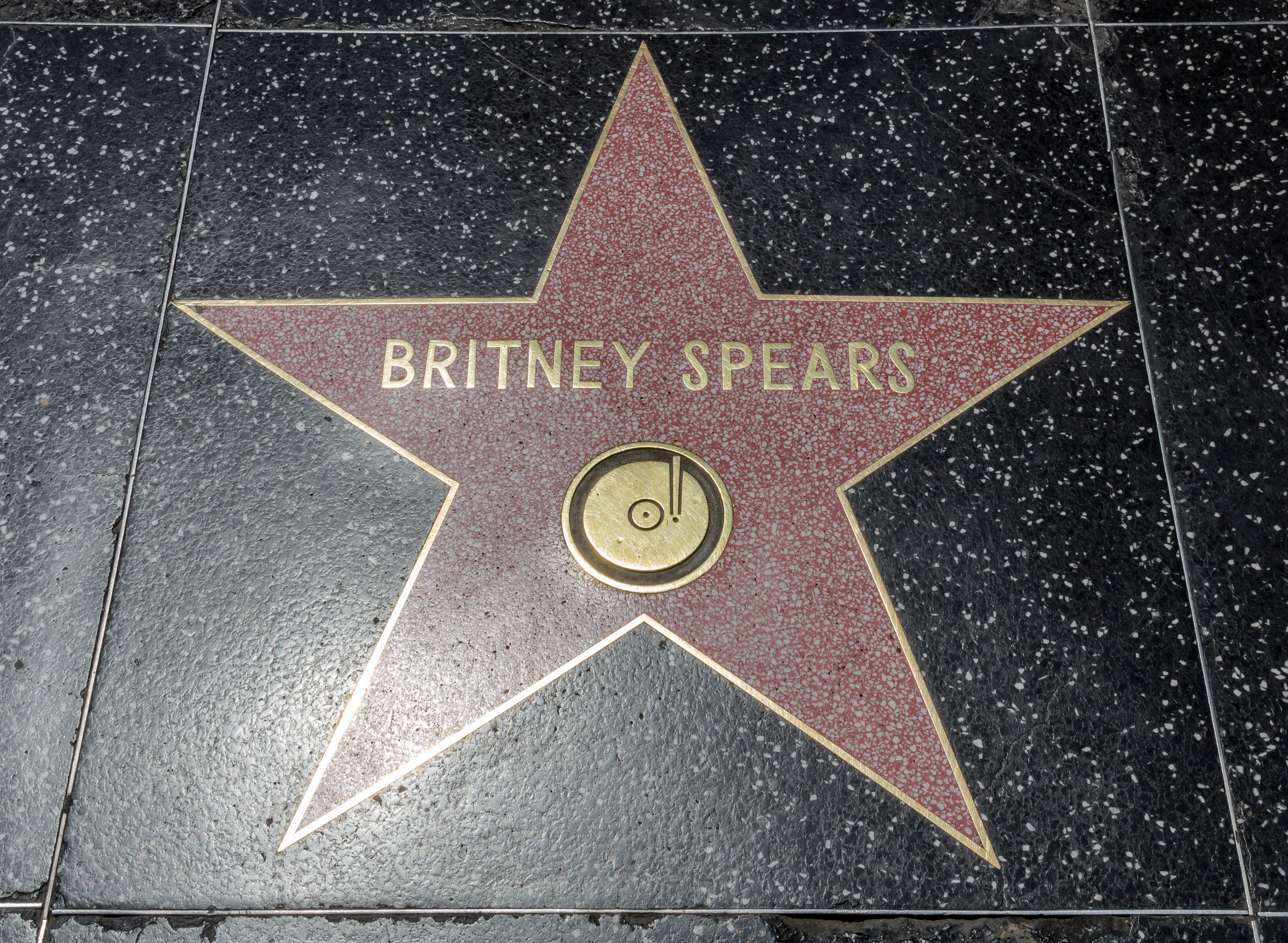
Spears' Hollywood Walk of Fame

In 1999, Spears was Inducted into the Young Hollywood Hall of Fame (Music Artist Category).

In 2003, Spears received a Star on Hollywood Walk of Fame (Recording Category) at the age of 21, making her the youngest singer to be inducted.

In 2013, Spears’ sales reached 13 million records in the United Kingdom, according to the Official Charts Company. "...Baby One More Time" was the best-selling single in 1999 in the United Kingdom.

Spears is listed by the Guinness World Records as having the "Best-selling album by a teenage solo artist" for her debut studio album, ...Baby One More Time. From 2000 to 2011, Spears set 14 Guinness World Records. She still currently holds eleven records including Best-selling album by a teenage solo artist (…Baby One More Time), Fastest-selling album by a teenage solo artist (Oops!… I Did It Again), Best-selling teenage artist and Youngest female to have five number-one studio albums.

=== Album achievements ===
…Baby One More Time (1999)

• …Baby One More Time the album and its lead single ("...Baby One More Time") went number-one simultaneously (Billboard Hot 100 and Billboard 200) making her the first new female artist to do this. Spears became the first new female artist to have both her debut single and debut album reach number one in the same week. Spears also became the youngest artist to receive Diamond certification for this album. The album is also certified diamond in Canada. …Baby One More Time became the 14th album since 1991 to sell over ten million copies in the US, and Spears became the best-selling female artist of 1999. It was also the second best-selling album of 1999 overall. The album is also the best selling album by a teenage female artist of all time, according to the Guinness World Records, and one of the best-selling albums of all time, selling an estimated 25 million copies worldwide. ...Baby One More Time is one of the best-selling albums in the United States and the Philippines. It was also the seventh highest-selling album of 1999 in Australia.

Oops!… I Did It Again (2000)

• Oops!... I Did It Again sold a whopping 1,319,193 million copies in its first-week, holding the record for the fastest-selling album by a female artist and the largest first-week sales for a female album for 15 years. In 2005, the album was certified diamond, making Spears the youngest artist of all time to have more than one diamond albums (…Baby One More Time and Oops!… I Did It Again). Oops!... I Did It Again became best-selling female album, the third best-selling album of 2000 in the United States and fourth best-selling album according to Billboard Year-End of 2000. By the end of 2000, it had sold 15 million copies worldwide. It is one of the 15 best-performing 21st-century albums. The album is one of the best-selling albums of all time with over 20 million copies sold. Every chart the album charted on, peaked within the top 10, the majority of the peaks being number-one, the lowest being number-10 in Poland.

Britney (2001)

• Britney made Spears the first female artist to have her first three studio albums debut atop the chart (first-week sales of 746,000 copies). Spears also held the second-highest debut album sales of 2001, and the album was the highest debut-week sales by a female artist of the year. Britney was the 3rd best-selling female album (second exclu. bands) and the fifth best-selling album of 2001 globally, selling seven million copies. With worldwide sales of over 10 million copies, Britney is one of the best-selling albums of the 21st century and one of the best-selling albums by a woman along with …Baby One More Time and Oops!… I Did It Again. In 2002, Britney was the 2nd female album on the Top Billboard 200 Album and 8th overall.

In the Zone (2003)

• In the Zone became Spears’ fourth number-one album, still making her the first female artist to have her first four albums reach number one and also the youngest artist to have four number albums. Spears also became the second female artist in Billboard's history to have four consecutive number-one albums, behind Janet Jackson. It initially registered the highest first-week sales of 2003 for a female artist for two weeks. In the Zone was the eighth best-selling album of 2003 worldwide. In 2004, In the Zone was the 3rd female album on the Top Billboard 200 Album and 8th overall.

Blackout (2007)

• Despite being Spears’ first studio album to not peak at number one due to Billboard's last-minute rule change, Spears set the record for the highest first-week digital sales for a female artist at the time. Blackout served as Spears’ fourth studio album to sell over 100,000 copies in its first-week in the U.S. Blackout was the world's 32nd best-selling album of 2007 and the 11th best-selling album by a female. Blackout's lead single "Gimme More" was Spears’ fourth album to garner Spears another top 10 single, peaking at number-three on the Hot 100 ("...Baby One More Time number-one, "Oops!... I Did It again" number-nine and "Toxic"). In 2007, Blackout was 138th on the Top Billboard 200 Album and 85th on the list in 2008.

Circus (2008)

• Circus became Spears’ fifth number-one album, opening with 505,000 copies in its first week, it also registered as the second biggest debut-week sales of 2008 for a female artist. The album spent nine weeks within the top ten, making it Spears's longest-running top-ten album since Oops!... I Did It Again. Circus served as Spears’ second album with a number-one single, "Womanizer". In less than a month, it became the ninth best-selling album of 2008 in the country and the second best-selling album by a female. The album was fourth on the year-end Top Billboard 200 Albums list (female) and 6th overall in 2009.

• Femme Fatale (2011)

• Femme Fatale became Spears’ sixth number one-album, giving Spears her sixth debut at the top of the chart and leaves her in a four-way tie for third most number-one albums for a female artist. In Germany, the album debuted at number ten, making it her seventh consecutive top-ten studio album. Femme Fatale served as Spears’ third album with a number-one single, "Hold It Against Me". Spears is one of the few to have an album peak at number one in three different decades. Femme Fatale was Spears’ successful era of singles on the US charts. The album was the 12th top-selling album of 2011 in its mid-year. In 2011, Femme Fatale was 31st on the Top Billboard 200 Album and the 11th female album on the list.

Britney Jean (2013)

• Britney Jean became Spears’ eighth studio album to sell more than 100,000 copies in its first week (107,000), also becoming her eighth consecutive top five album in the U.S. It is also Spears’ eighth studio album to be certified Gold or higher by the Recording Industry Association of America (RIAA). The album was 74th on the year-end Top Billboard 200 Albums list overall and the 18th female album on the list in 2014.

Glory (2016)

• Glory became Spears’ ninth studio album to sell more than 100,000 copies in its first week (111,000), also becoming her ninth consecutive top five album in the U.S. The album was certified Gold in Canada, becoming Spears’ ninth studio album to be certified Silver, Gold or higher in the country. Despite only being on the charts for eight weeks, Glory was 172nd on the year-end Top Billboard 200 Albums list overall in 2016.

=== Other album achievements ===
Greatest Hits: My Prerogative (2004)

• Greatest Hits: My Prerogative peaked at number four on the Billboard 200 with first-week sales of 255,000 copies. Despite not peaking at number one, the album was Spears’ fifth overall album to peak within the five in the U.S. The compilation album has sold over 5 million copies worldwide.

The Singles Collection (2009)

• The Singles Collection peaked at number 22 on the Billboard 200 with first-week sales of 26,800 copies. In 2015, the album had reported to of sold over 250,000 copies alone in the U.S. The compilation album is Spears' longest-charting album on the UK Albums Chart.

Tour Achievements

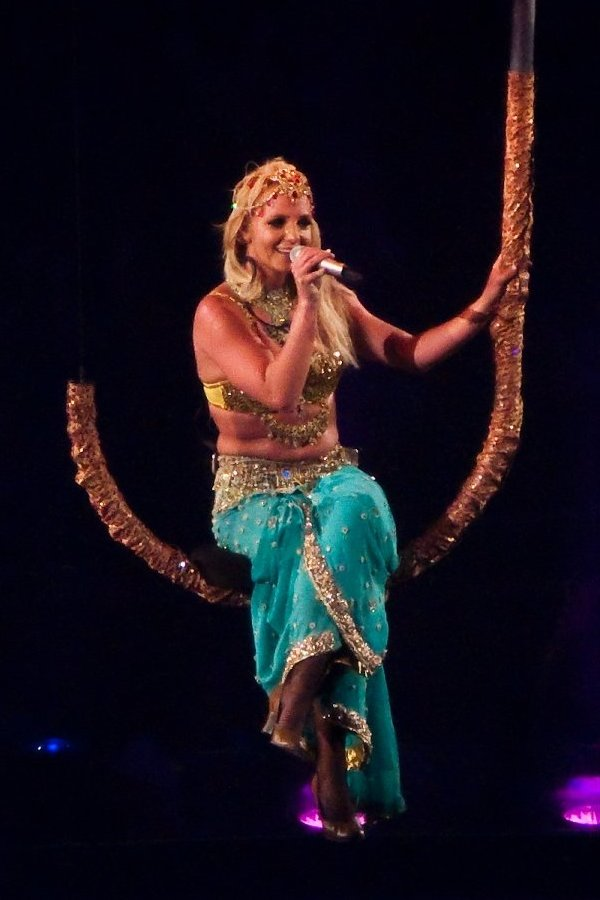
Spears performing "Everytime" in 2009

According to Pollstar, Spears has grossed more than $485 million in revenue throughout her career, making Spears the eighth Highest Grossing Female Soloist, having sold more than 6.07 million tickets.

Spears’ Oops!... I Did It Again Tour was the 10th overall Top 10 Tours of 2000 and the 3rd for a female artist (inclu. girl bands). Her Dream Within a Dream Tour was 6th on Billboard's Top 25 tours in 2001/2. The Onyx Hotel Tour was 18th on Billboard's Top 25 Tours in 2004. The Circus: Starring Britney Spears was the fifth highest-grossing tour of 2009 and was 7th on Billboard's Top 25 Tours of 2009. The Femme Fatale Tour was 11th on Pollstar’s Top tours of 2011 worldwide. In 2013, Spears embarked on her Las Vegas Residency, Britney: Piece of Me. The residency lasted 248 shows until 2017. The last show of the residency on December 31, 2017, broke the record for the highest-grossing single concert in a theater residency ever in Las Vegas. The residency scored a box office of $137.7 million. Britney: Piece of Me was 6th on the 25 Biggest Concert Residencies of All Time. In 2018, Spears embarked on the Piece of Me Tour. The tour ranked at numbers 86 and 30 on Pollstar's 2018 Year-End Top 100 Tours chart both in North America and worldwide, respectively.

== Endorsements ==
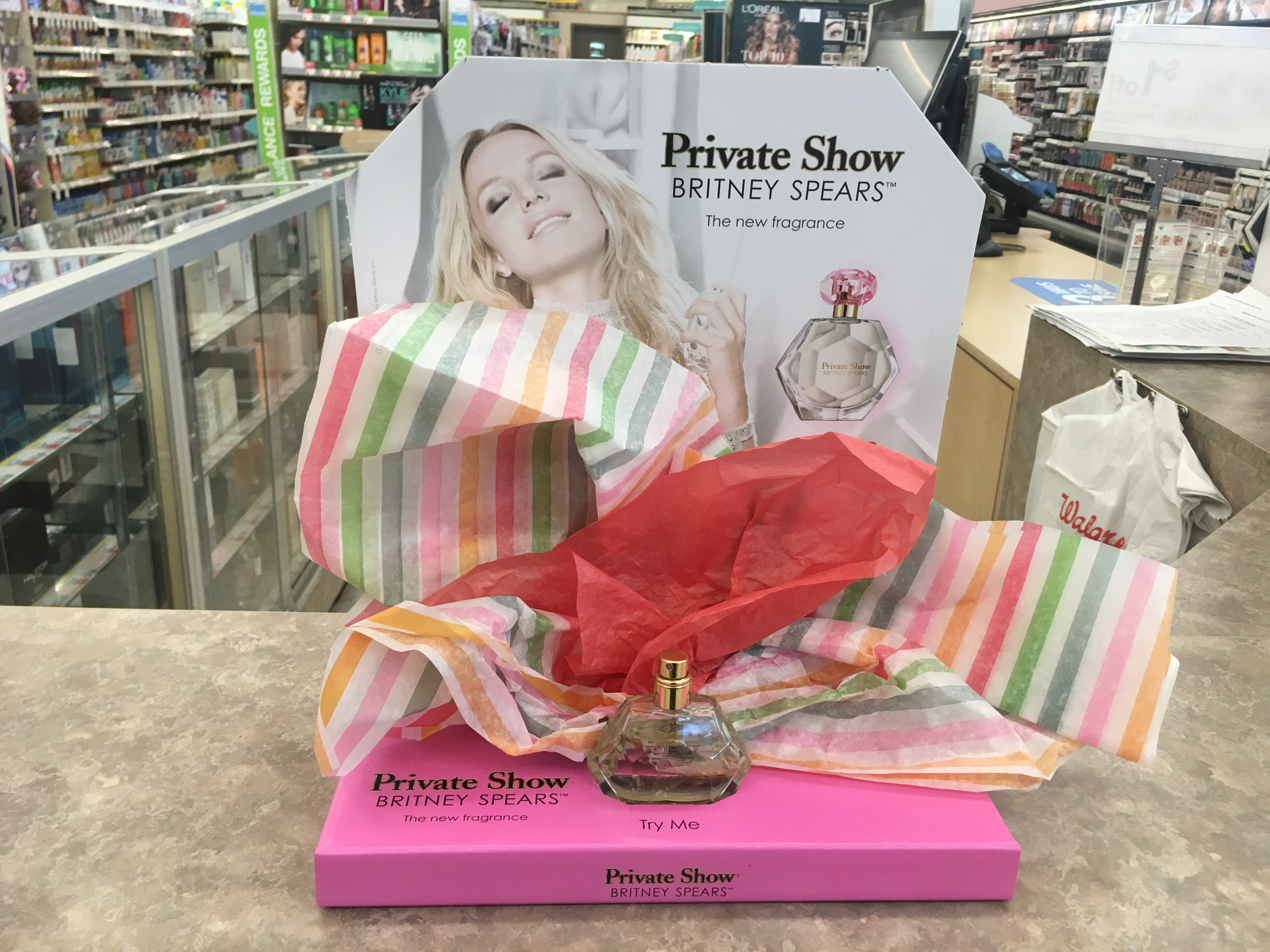
Spears's fragrance, Private Show, released in 2016

In 1999, Spears released a dolls line produced by Play Along Toys. The dolls were a huge success, with the initial doll selling over 800,000 units. To date, over 5 million of the assorted Britney Dolls have been sold. According to the Winnipeg Free Press, the doll is the second best-selling celebrity doll of all time, behind only the Spice Girls dolls. Production of the doll was later discontinued sometime in late 2001 or early 2002, however, it has become a collector's item among her fans and doll collectors, usually sold on eBay.

In 2002, Spears starred in the teen movie Crossroads, directed by Tamra Davis, alongside Zoe Saldaña and Taryn Manning. The movie was a box-office hit, grossing $61.1 million worldwide on a $10‒12 million budget. The film was panned by critics, however, Spears' performance was praised, being nominated for two MTV Movie Awards and three Teen Choice Awards.

In 2004, Spears endorsed her first Elizabeth Arden perfume, Curious, in 2004, and made $100 million in sales in its first year and was the top selling fragrance of the year. As of 2009, Spears claimed to have sold 30 million bottles worldwide. As of 2012, her fragrances brand had grossed over $1.5 billion worldwide. According to a Daily Express newspaper report in 2013, a bottle of a Spears fragrance was sold every 15 seconds worldwide. Also in 2013, the Hollywood Reporter reported that "Curious" had sold more than 500 million bottles over its first decade. In 2021, Spears's brother Bryan claimed that her perfume sales had grossed $100 billion. As of June 2024, Spears has released 40 fragrances under her brand.

In October 2023, Spears released her memoir The Woman In Me, becoming a number one New York Times best-seller and selling 1.1 million copies in its first week in the United States. Spears signed a $15 million book deal to write the book, which is one of the biggest book deals of all time, alongside Bill Clinton, who also received $15 million to write his memoir My Life. As of January 11, 2024, The Woman in Me has sold over two million copies in the US, according to People magazine. The audio version also debuted at number one and sales through all print and digital versions combined reached 170,000 units. Worldwide, as of November 1, 2023, it sold an estimated amount of 2.4 million copies in print sales. Three months after its release, the memoir was deemed the "#1 listened to title on Spotify". Before its release, Spears claimed that it was the best-selling celebrity memoir of all time.

Spears has endorsed several brands throughout her career, including Pepsi, Polaroid, McDonald's, Hasbro, Versace, NFL, Skechers, Got Milk?, Tommy Hilfiger, Clairol, Herbal Essences, Samsung, Nabisco, Virgin Mobile, Zappos, Kenzo, Sbarro, ABC, HBO, Candies, Lidl, Kohl's, Starburst candy, Eos, iHeart Radio, Kirin Company, Apple Music, Disney, Los Angeles Dodgers, and Toyota. She has also included endorsements in her music videos for brands such as Bvlgari, Swarovski, Volkswagen, Mazda, MateFit, Plenty of Fish, Beats Electronics, Sony, Nokia, Lamborghini, and Samsung.

== Creative inspiration ==
=== Influences ===
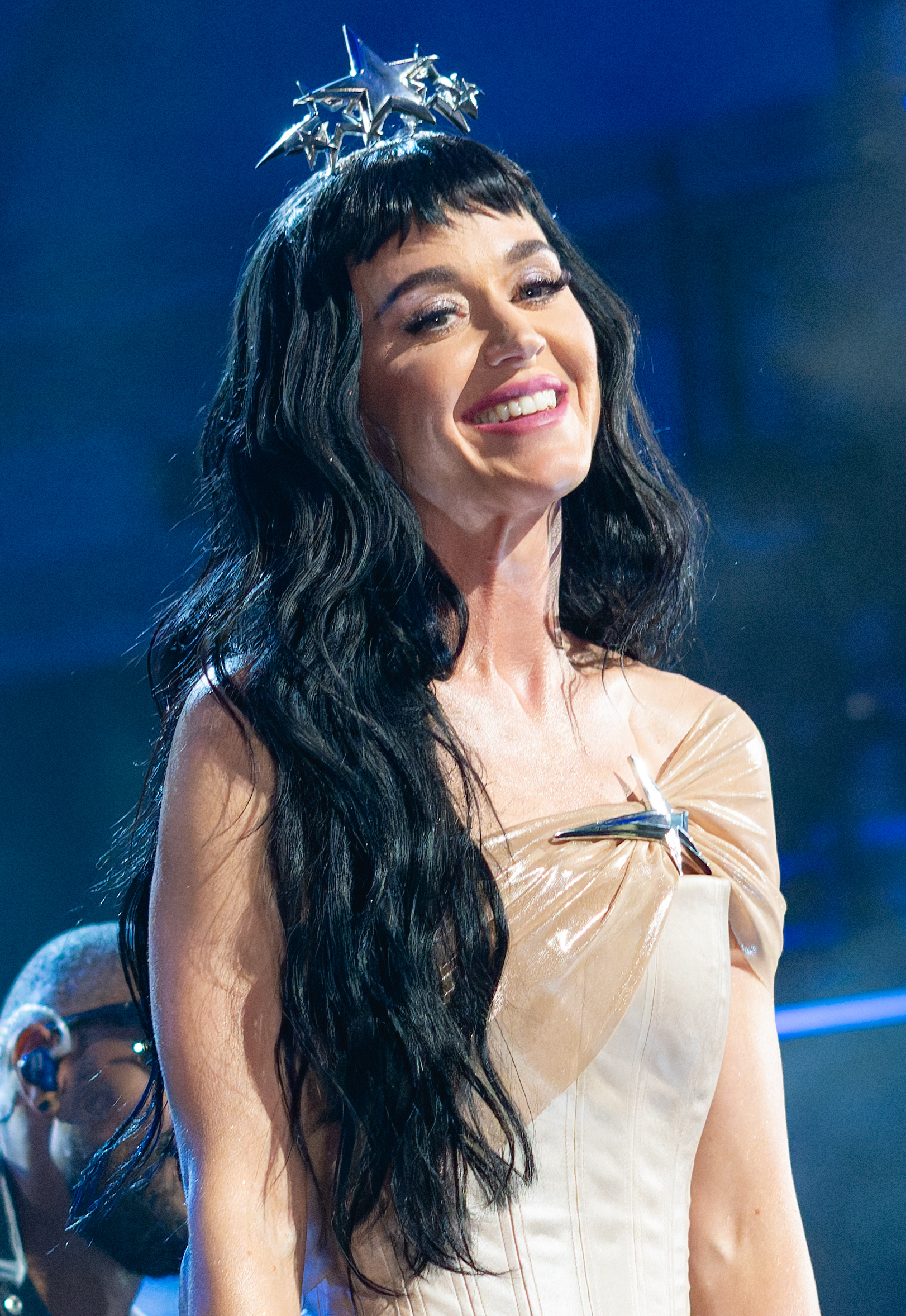
Katy Perry

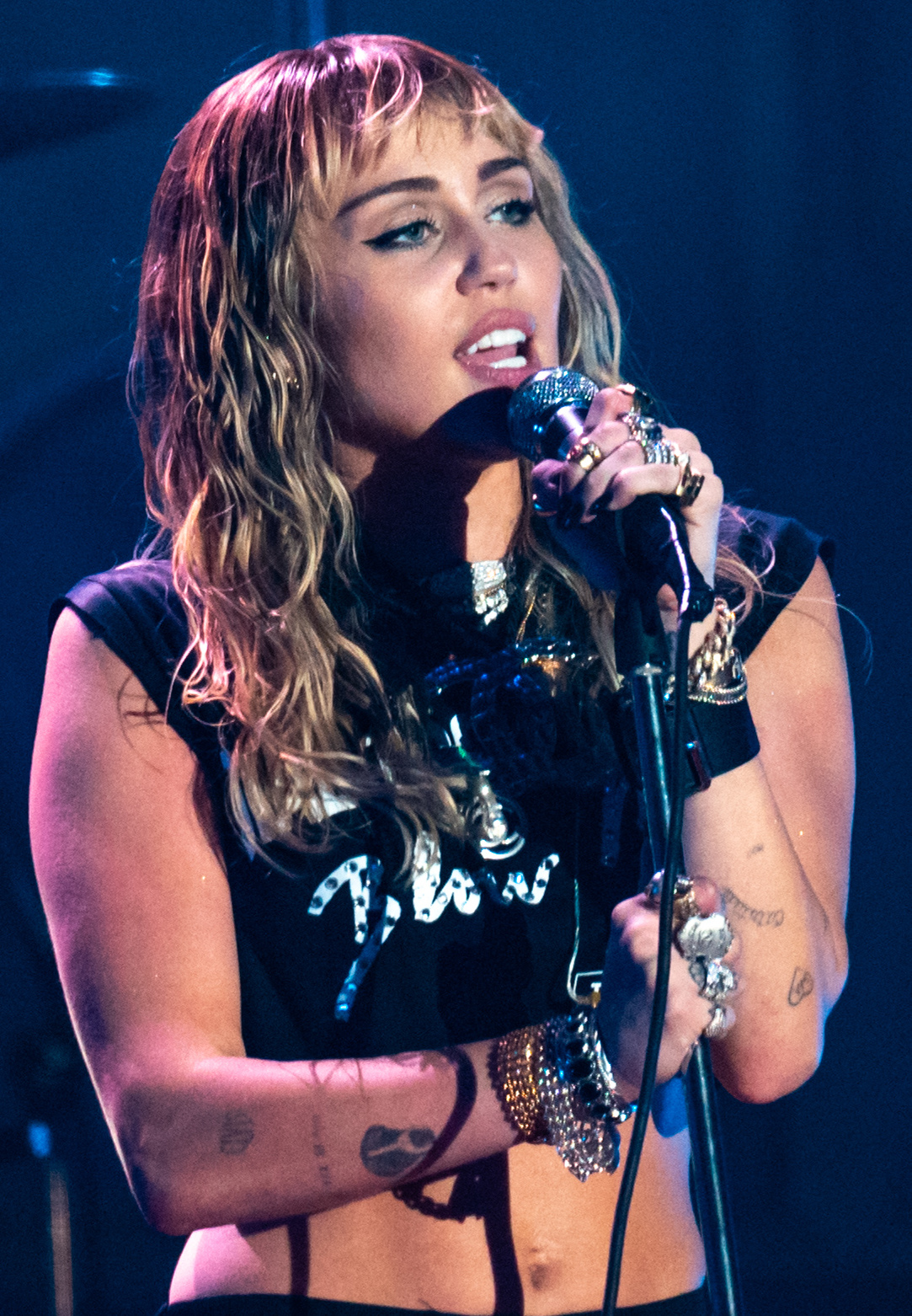
Miley Cyrus

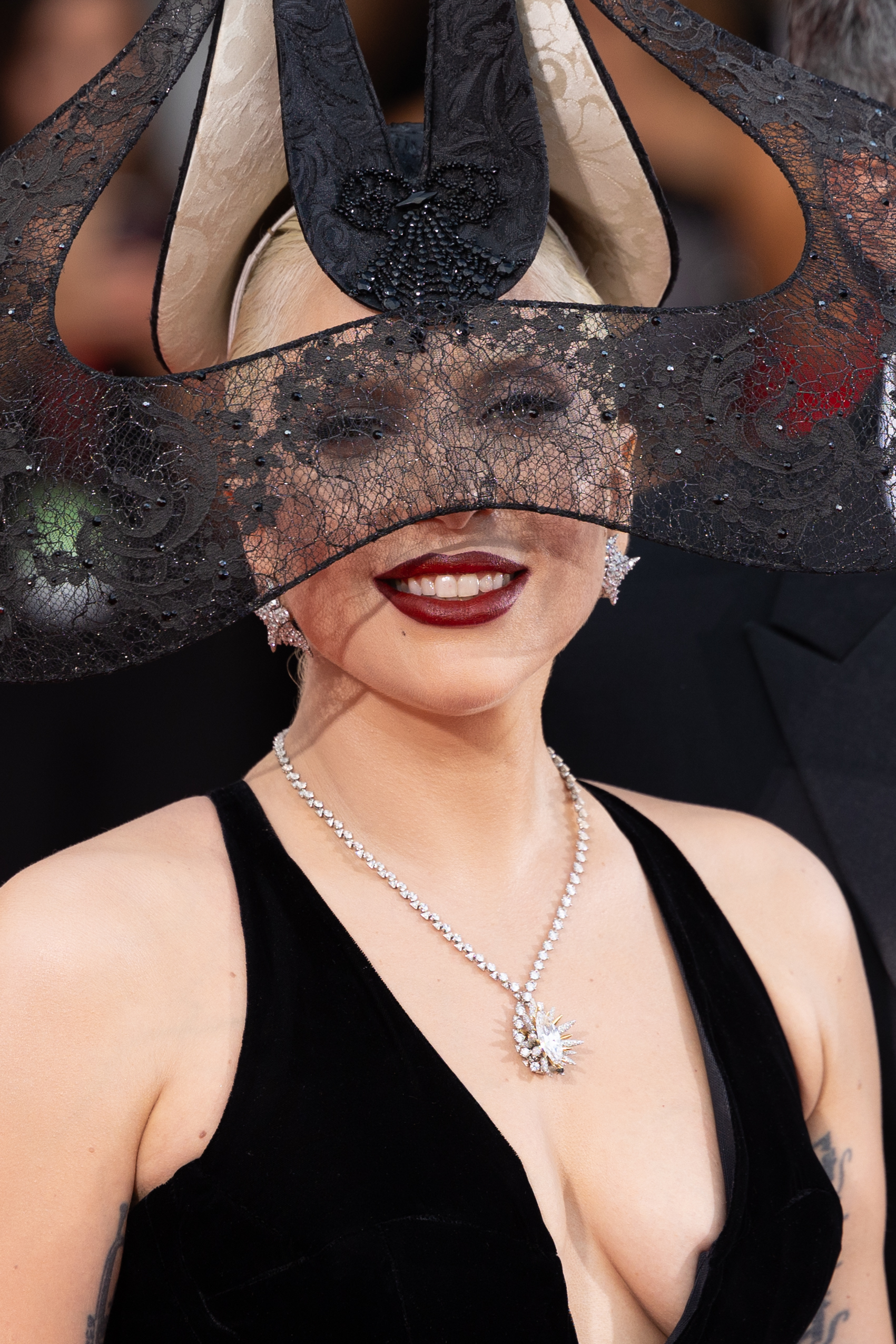
Lady Gaga

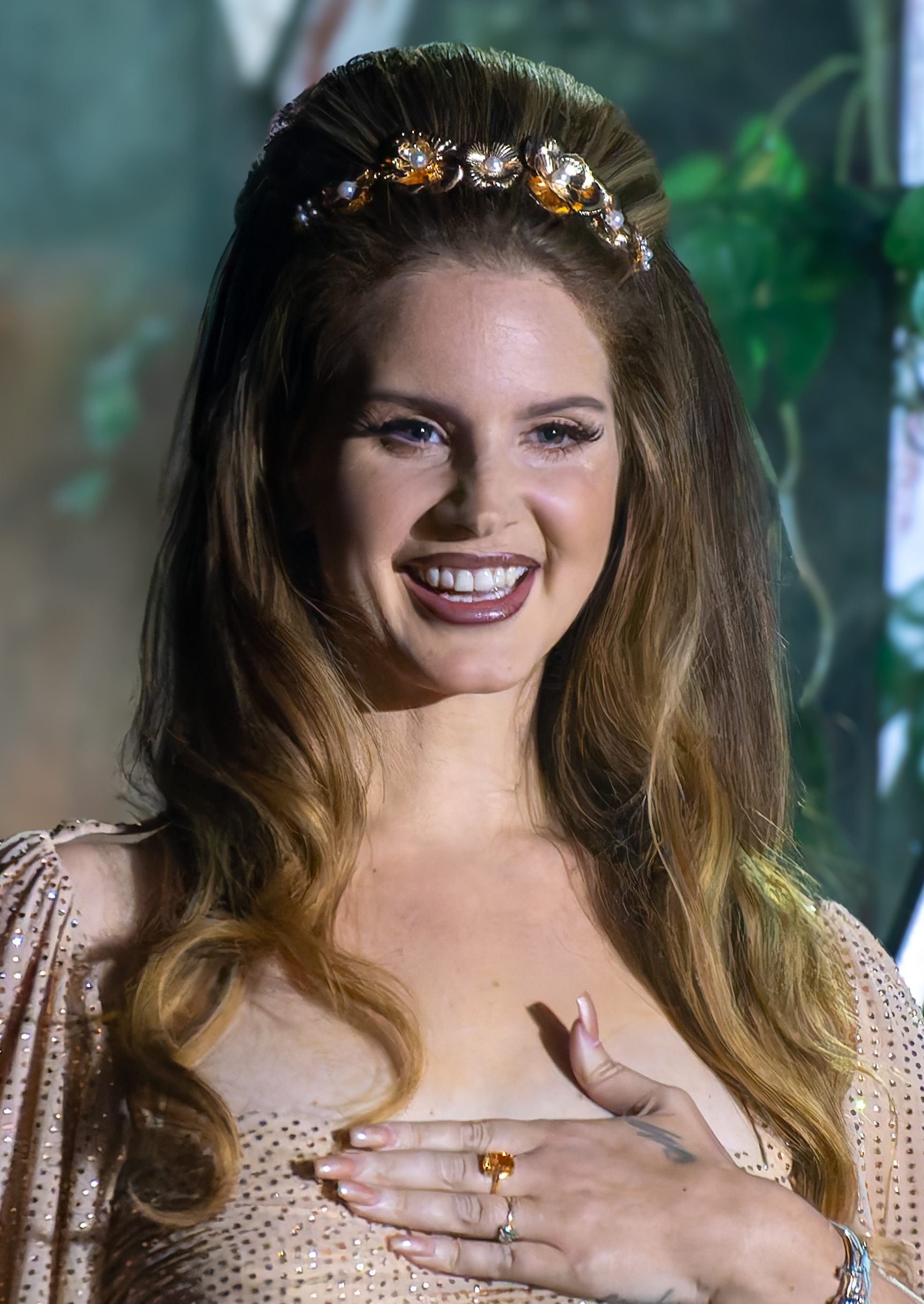
Lana Del Rey

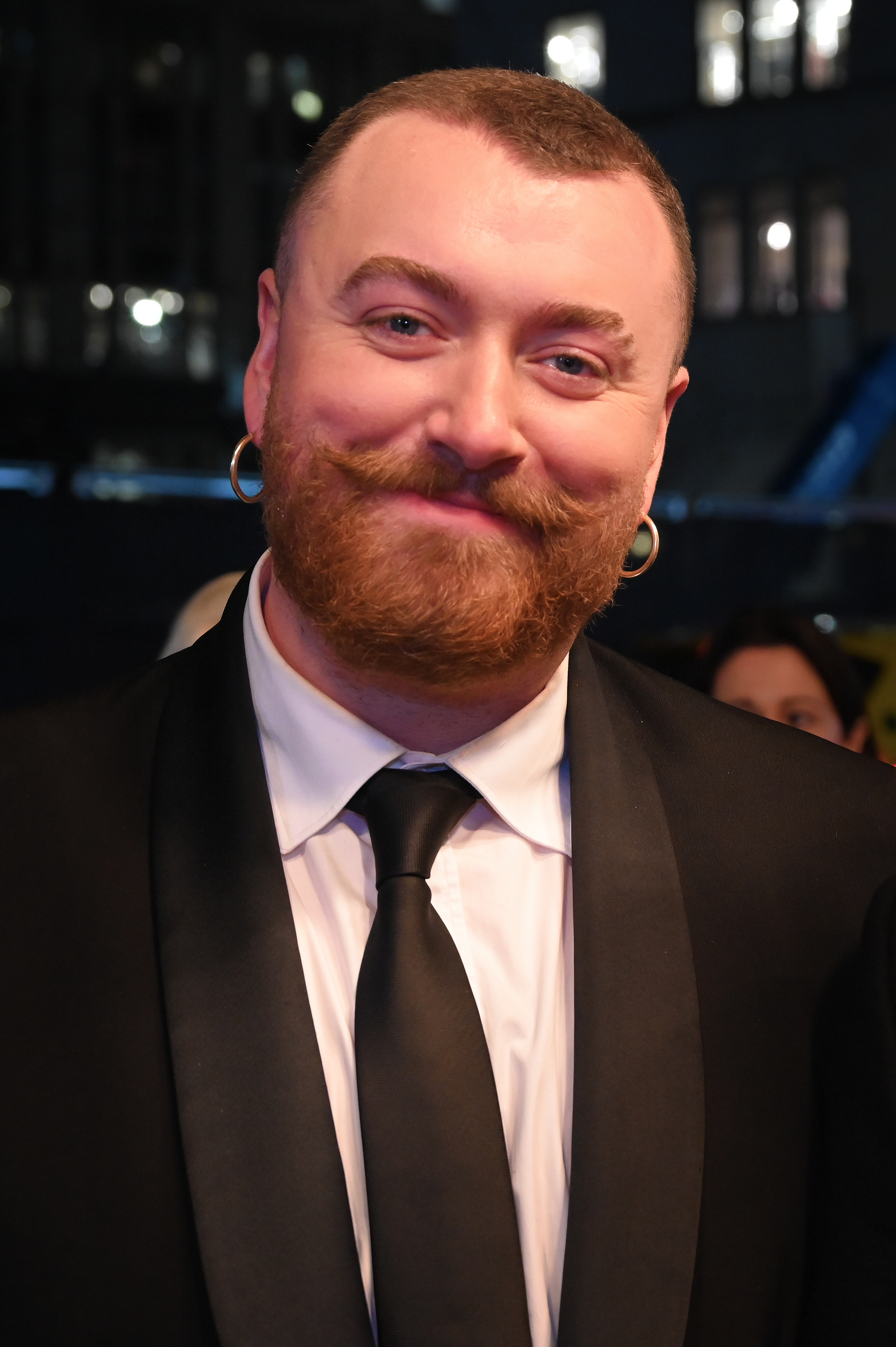
Sam Smith

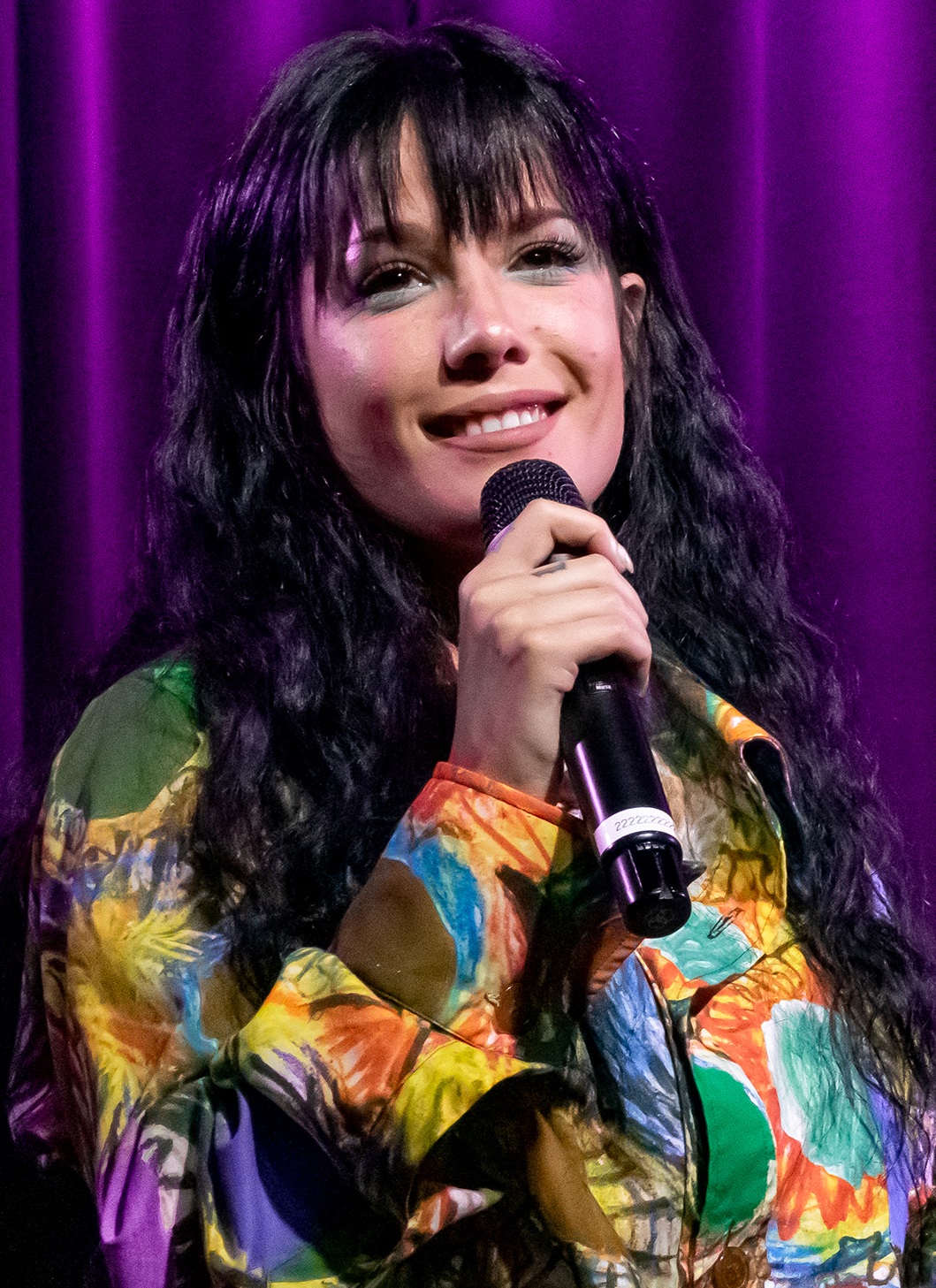
Halsey

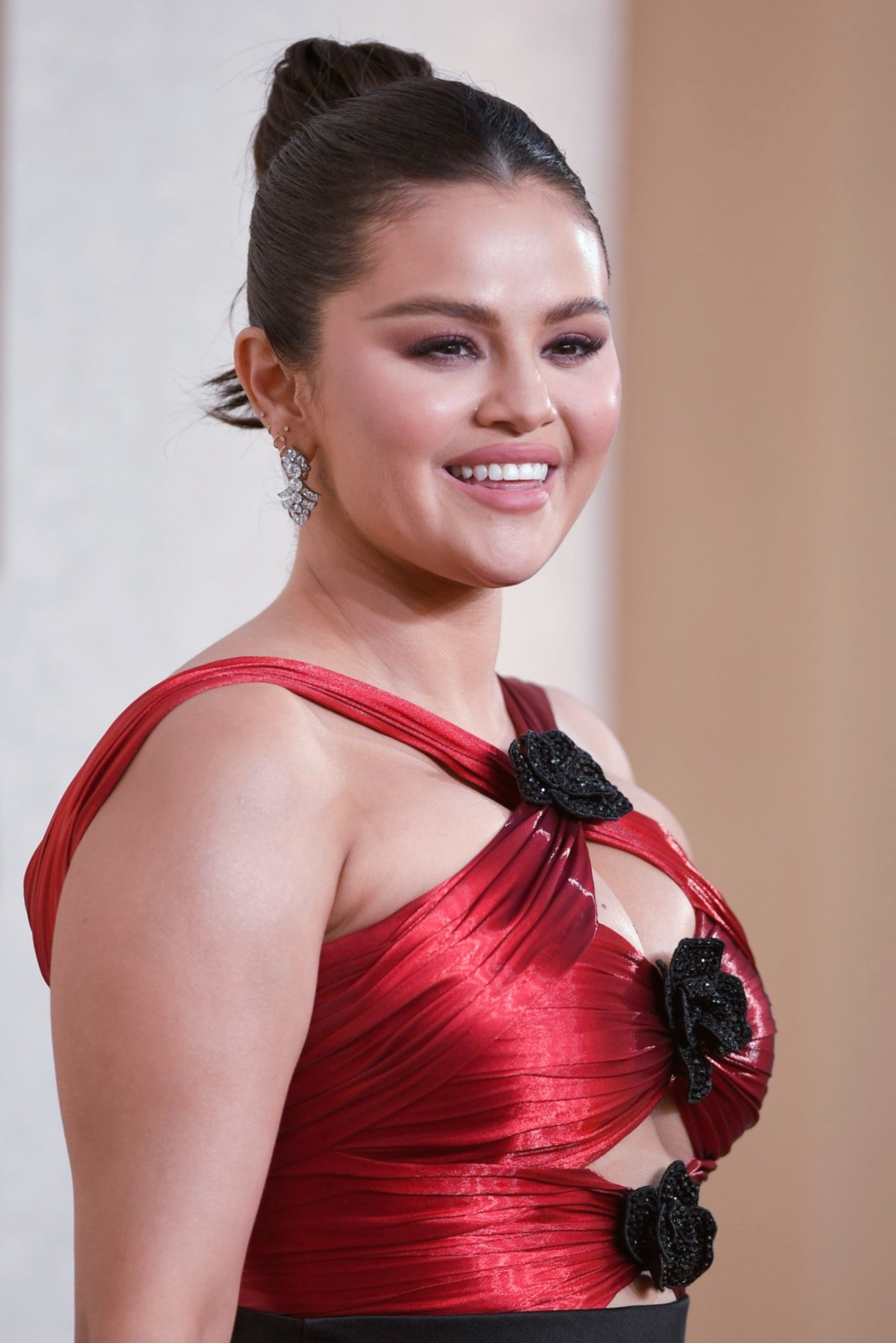
Selena Gomez

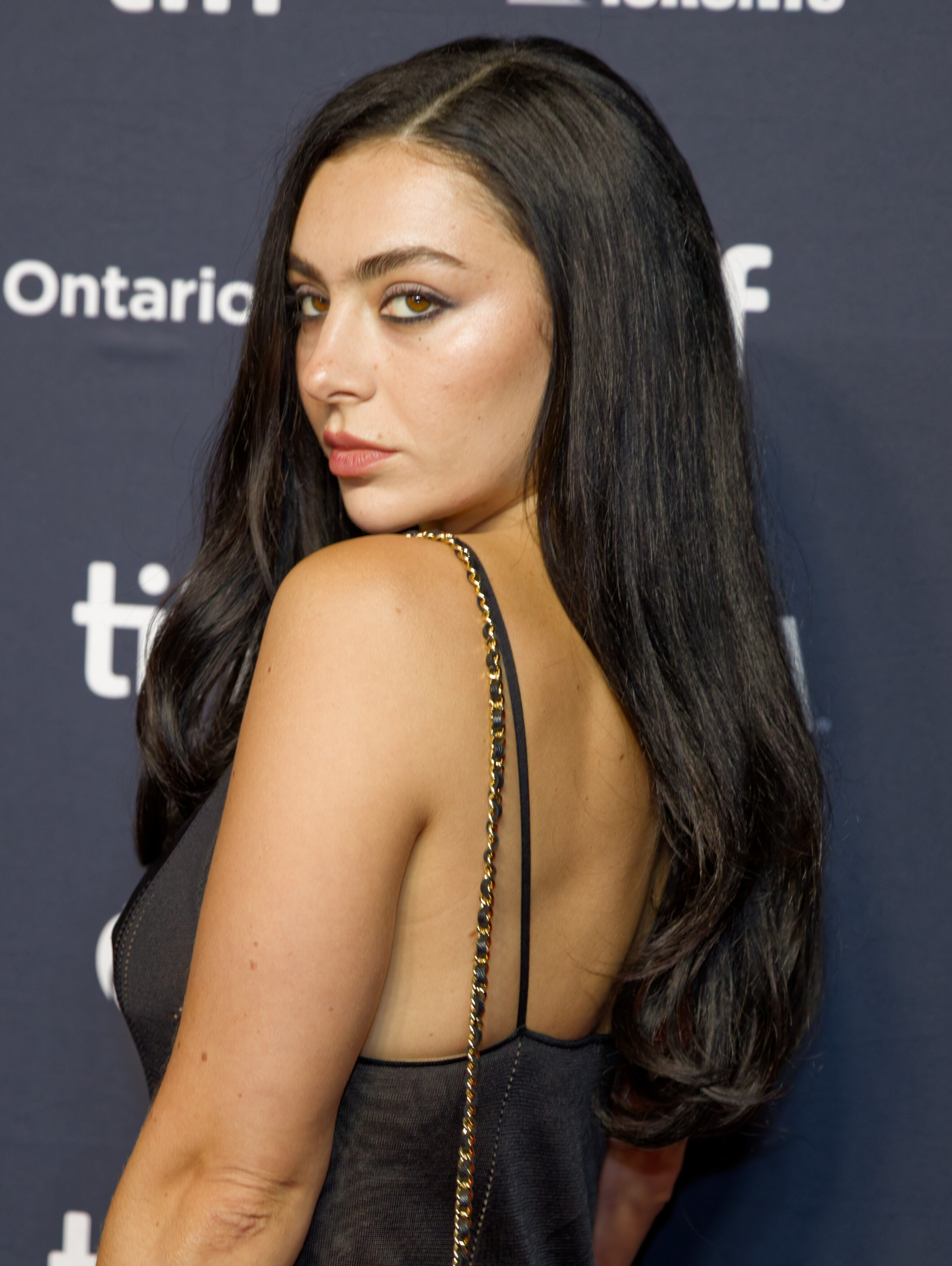
Charli XCX

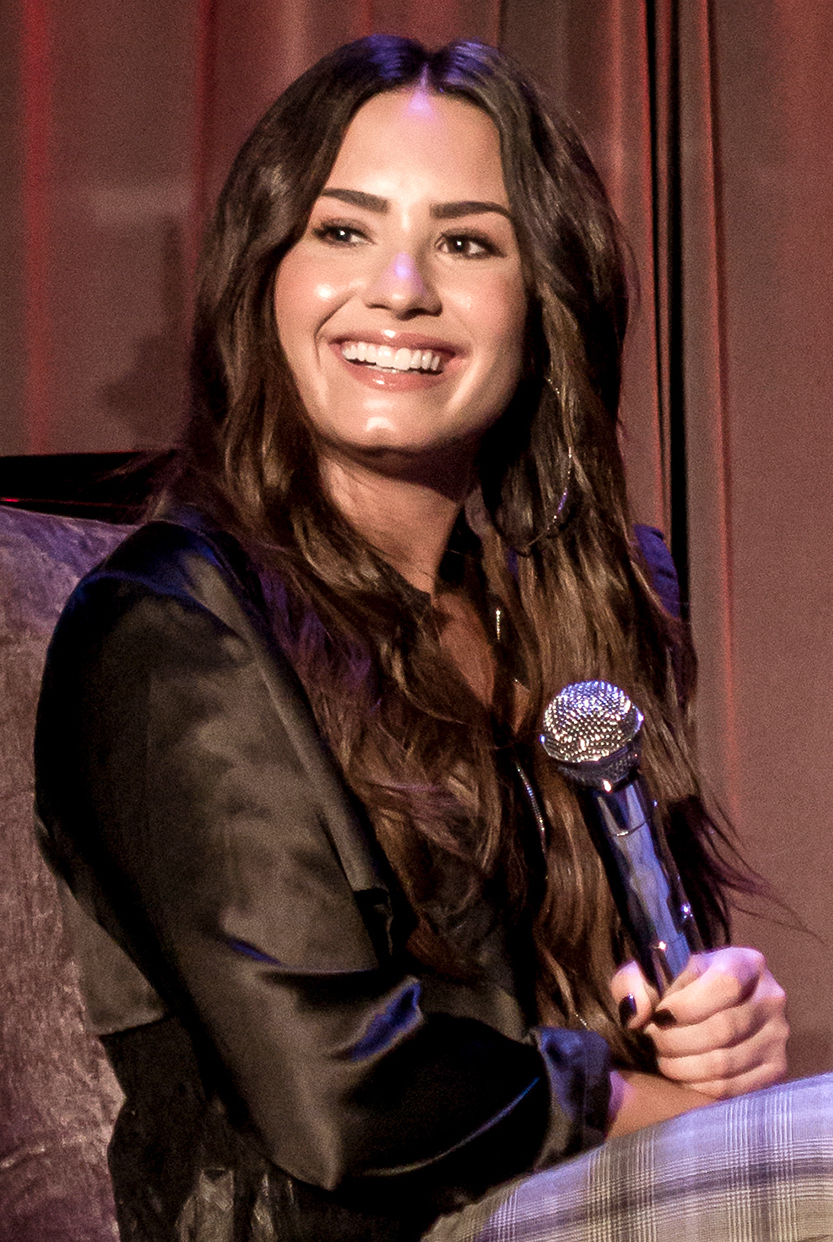
Demi Lovato

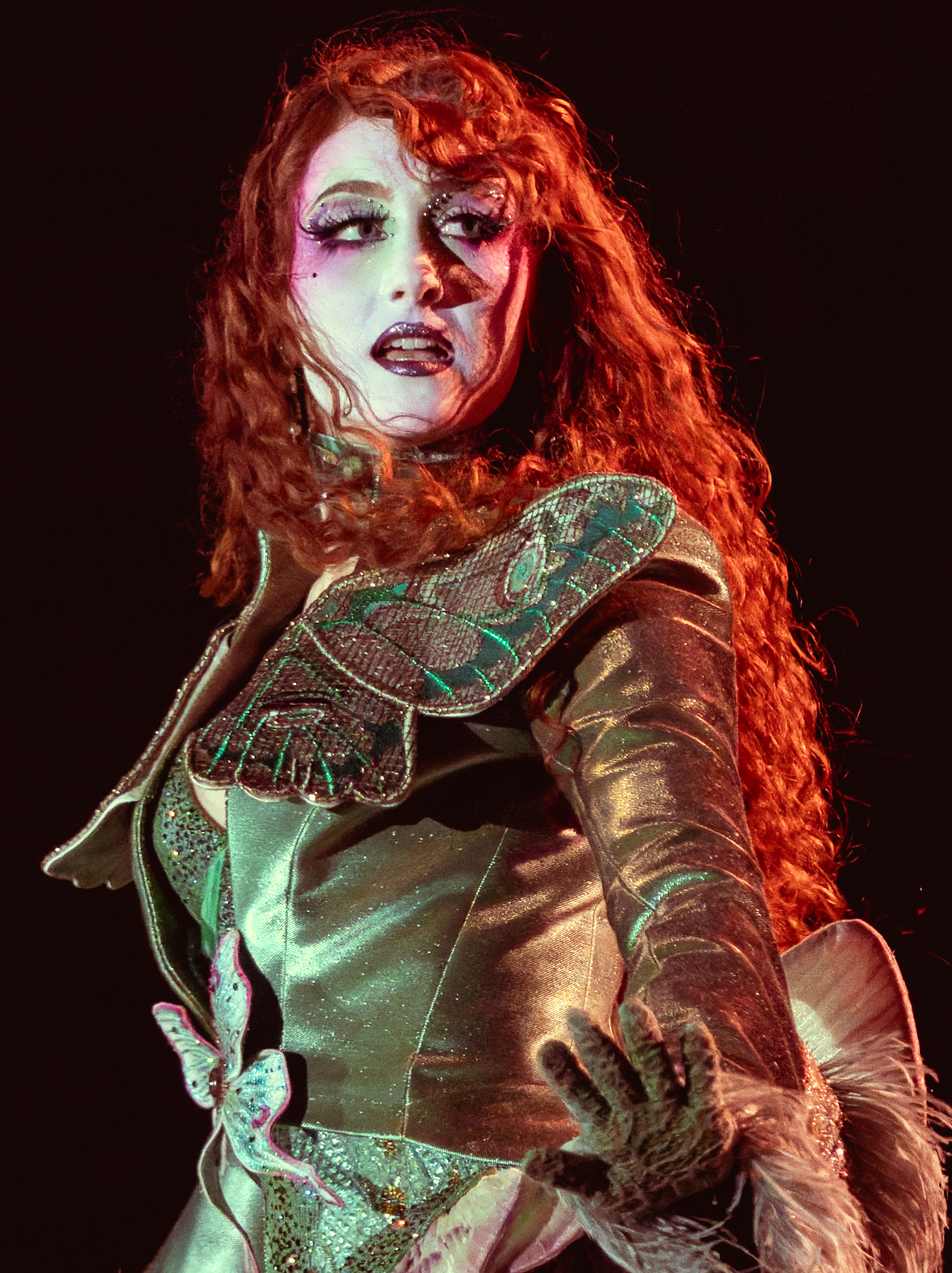
Chappell Roan

Billie Eilish

Tate McRae

Spears has influenced artists across generations and genres, including those pictured above.

Throughout her career, Spears's impact on popular culture has inspired and influenced numerous recording artists and acts. Various artists include:

- Addison Rae
- Adéla
- Alexa Nikolas
- Alice Chater
- Ariana Madix
- Ashley Tisdale
- Bebe Rexha
- Becky G
- Bella Thorne
- Billie Eilish
- Blake Lively
- Cassie
- Chappell Roan
- Charlie Brooker
- Charli XCX
- Chapin Sisters
- Cheryl
- Coco Jones
- Demi Lovato
- Derrick Barry
- Dua Lipa
- Grimes
- Hailee Steinfeld
- Halsey
- Heidi Montag
- Hilary Duff
- Jade Thirlwall
- Jisoo
- Katy Perry
- Kelly Key
- Kelsea Ballerini
- Kesha
- Kim Petras
- Kylie Cantrall
- Lady Gaga
- Lana Del Rey
- Leah Wellbaum of Slothrust
- Lindsay Lohan
- Lisa
- Little Boots
- Lucy Hale
- Lily-Rose Depp
- Madison Beer
- Madonna
- Marina Diamandis
- Meghan Trainor
- Miley Cyrus
- Normani
- Olivia Rodrigo
- Olly Alexander
- Pabllo Vittar
- Paris Hilton
- Perrie Edwards
- Porcelain Black
- Rina Sawayama
- Rita Ora
- Sabrina Carpenter
- Sam Smith
- Selena Gomez
- Shania Twain
- Slayyyter
- Tate McRae
- Tegan and Sara
- The-Dream
- The Weeknd
- Tiffany Young
- Troye Sivan
- Tyla
- Victoria Justice

Comedian and actor Benito Skinner has frequently cited Spears as a major personal and creative inspiration, crediting her music with helping him navigate his identity growing up and incorporating her work into both his early comedy impressions and his 2025 series Overcompensating. Spears has also inspired fictional characters such as Bloom from Winx Club, Kelly Center from the film Country Strong (2010), Sam Montgomery from A Cinderella Story (2004), while characters as a parody of her include Ginger Fox from ICarly, Britney Britney from The Fairly OddParents and Brittany Pierce from Glee and more, making her one of the most parioded celebrities ever. In a season one episode of the Netflix series Ginny & Georgia, MANG (Max, Abby, Norah and Ginny) all dress up as Spears for Halloween.

=== In the Zone impact ===
In late 2003, Spears released her fourth studio album In the Zone, which was deemed a metamorphosis for Spears by numerous critics. Critics regarded the album as showcasing a more mature and sensual expression compared to her previous works. Spears explained that the album's sexual nature (e.g. "Touch of my Hand") was subconscious and emerged while she was in the process of developing the album. Upon its release, the song received positive reviews, with music critics praising it as an outstanding ballad that evokes a strong emotional response.

On the 15th anniversary of the album's release, Jason Lipshutz of Billboard claimed it "signaled a more mature direction for Spears as she explored electronic music and hip-hop like never before. And the record's lyrics — which referenced her breakup with Justin Timberlake and pushed back at her critics in the media — celebrated new levels of independence and candor for the singer.

Various artists have paid homage to In the Zone including The Weeknd, Ellie Goulding, Rita Ora, Selena Gomez, Taylor Swift, Katy Perry, and Ethel Cain.

=== Covers and samples ===
Spears's discography has been covered and sampled across the music world by a variety of artists. These artists include Ariana Grande, Ashley Tisdale, Ed Sheeran, Fall Out Boy, Ethel Cain, Hailee Steinfeld, Harry Styles, Hozier, Kelly Clarkson, Lewis Capaldi, Lorde, Madonna, Måneskin, Meghan Trainor, Melanie Martinez, Miley Cyrus, Sabrina Carpenter, Selena Gomez, Sofia Carson, Slayyyter, Sia, Taio Cruz, Taylor Swift, Tori Kelly and more. American singer Beyoncé sampled "Toxic" during her Renaissance World Tour (2023). American singer Halsey interpolated Spears's "Lucky" for her single with the same title.

=== Fashion ===
Spears had a significant impact on fashion in the early 2000s, particularly with the Y2K style. Some of her most iconic looks include low-rise jeans, crop tops, cargo pants, and bedazzled, glitter-strewn embellishments.

Spears has been credited with introducing the navel piercing to mainstream culture. Spears got her navel pierced on New Years Eve in 1999 while in Hawaii with *NSYNC and Danielle Fishel which she then revealed on Total Request Live in 2000.

Multiple journalists have pointed out Spears's influence on the fashion choices of several celebrities, including Kendall Jenner, Normani, Bella Hadid, Dua Lipa, Megan Fox, Millie Bobby Brown, Sydney Sweeney, Hailey Bieber, Olivia Rodrigo, Paris Hilton, Katy Perry, Brie Larson, Jessica Alba, Tyra Banks, Blake Lively, Sabrina Carpenter, Kourtney Kardashian, Tate McRae and more. Overall, Spears blended urban fashion elements with extravagant stage costumes, influencing the popularity of the Y2K style in the early 21st century.
