= Jay Foreman (businessman) =

American businessman

Jay Foreman is an American businessman who lives and works in Boca Raton, Florida. He is president and CEO of Basic Fun!, which began as The Bridge Direct in 2009. Basic Fun! and its related companies, Good Stuff, K'nex, Uncle Milton, and PlayHut, design, develop and market toys for children and adult collectors. The company's product portfolio includes internally developed brands like Mash'ems and Cutetitos, as well as licensed product lines from major entertainment companies, sports leagues, and other toy companies, such as Mattel and Hasbro. In 2020 the company relaunched Tonka and Care Bears, which can now be found at major retailers around the world.

== Early career ==
Foreman began his toy career in the amusement industry at the age of 18, while working at games on the boardwalk in Wildwood, New Jersey. In 1986, he became a sales rep for Fable Toys, which manufactured stuffed toys in its own factory in Brooklyn, New York.

In 1990, Foreman co-founded Play By Play Toys in San Antonio, Texas, with Arturo Torres. He served as the general manager of the company from 1990 to 1996. Play By Play manufactured and distributed toys and novelties to the amusement and theme park industries. In 1992, Foreman secured rights for the company to make stuffed toys using the Coca-Cola and Harley Davidson brand names. These products were picked up by Walmart, the company's first traditional retail customer, expanding Play By Play's distribution from amusement channels into mass-market stores. In subsequent years, the company acquired licenses to make toys with Looney Tunes and Disney brands as well. Play By Play went public in 1995 on the NASDAQ exchange under the symbol PBYP. The following year, Play By Play acquired its largest competitor, Ace Novelty.

In 1996, Foreman joined San Francisco-based Galoob Toys. As Senior Vice President, he was tasked with building a direct-import division and managing the development of internally conceived product lines. Foreman's major achievement at Galoob was identifying the opportunity and securing global rights to manufacture fashion dolls based on The Spice Girls, in cooperation with Simon Fuller, President of 19 Entertainment. Powered by the global pop-music phenomenon of the girl group, the toy line became the first to oust Barbie as the best-selling fashion doll by units, in both 1997 and 1998. The Spice Girls dolls became the most profitable toy line in Galoob's history at the time, with sales exceeding $125 Million in 1998.

That same year, Foreman left Galoob, as the company was negotiating its sale to Hasbro. He joined Empire of Carolina in Florida as head of marketing and product development. At Empire, Foreman met Charlie Emby who was head of sales for the company and Foreman's future business partner.

== Play Along Toys ==
In 1999, Foreman and Emby both left Empire and co-founded Play Along Toys with an angel investment of $3M. Here, Foreman managed marketing, product development and sourcing. The company's first product line was a range of Britney Spears dolls and toys modeled after the emerging pop star. Some of the other product lines from Play Along included the relaunch of Cabbage Patch Kids, Care Bears, Puppy in My Pocket, Doodle Bear, plus licensed lines including The Lord of the Rings action figures. With the addition of these lines, Play Along's sales grew to over $130 Million by the end of 2003. The company's biggest hit came a few years later, in the form of a doll line based on Disney’s Hannah Montana TV show.

In 2004, Play Along was sold to Jakks Pacific and became a wholly owned division of that company. The total compensation for the deal was valued to be an excess of $135 Million if Play Along achieved all of its earnings targets over a 3.5-year earnout period, which it did. Play Along's sales peaked at $240 million in 2007. Foreman and his partners managed the division for Jakks Pacific until January 2008, when they exited the company.

== Oaktree Capital Management ==
In 2008, Foreman was engaged by Oaktree Capital Management to advise on its plan to acquire and take private Jakks Pacific. Under the terms of the arrangement, once acquired, Foreman would become the Jakks CEO. Together, Foreman and Oaktree pursued Jakks for three years but despite an offer to purchase the company, they failed to break the board's poison pill blockade and were unsuccessful in their acquisition efforts.

During this time, Foreman on his own acquired Camp Beverly Hills, a 1980s clothing line.

== The Bridge Direct / Basic Fun! ==
In 2009, Foreman and Oaktree Capital Management founded The Bridge Direct, a consumer products company focused on children's entertainment products. The plan was to grow the company organically through internally conceived product lines, as well as through acquisitions. Initially, the company acted as a licensee and agent for Cepia LLC, maker of the world-famous ZhuZhu Pets toys. In 2010, The Bridge Direct launched its first internally conceived toy line by acquiring the licensing rights for pop star Justin Bieber. Propelled by the singer's ascent to fame, the doll line quickly became a hit with fans.

Foreman began implementing his acquisition strategy for The Bridge Direct in 2013. His first target was the Good Stuff company and its Basic Fun! division, based in Jersey City, NJ. Good Stuff was a supplier of toys to the leisure industry, and the Basic Fun! division was known for collectible key chains, novelty, and retro toys. The acquisition in 2013 expanded The Bridge Direct's product offering and distribution. The retro toy line became a large part of the combined company's portfolio, including reproductions of classic toys like the Fisher-Price Chatter Phone and Hasbro's Lite-Brite and electronic Simon game. The company subsequently added more retro toys to its portfolio including classic reproductions of the original My Little Pony and Pound Puppies toys, as well as a line of handheld electronic games including Pac-Man, Frogger, and The Oregon Trail.

In 2017, The Bridge Direct merged with Toronto-based Tech 4 Kids, bringing the Mash'ems surprise collectible product line into the portfolio. The combined company later acquired Uncle Milton Industries, which manufactures STEM-related toys including Uncle Milton's Ant Farm. Later that year, the company rebranded itself as Basic Fun!

In early 2018, the company acquired K'nex, the American-made construction toy brand which also manufactures Lincoln Logs and Tinker Toys, under license from Hasbro.

In addition to its headquarters in Boca Raton, FL, Basic Fun! has a sales office in the UK (part of the K'nex acquisition) and an office and showroom in Hong Kong. The Hong Kong-based staff oversees engineering and manufacturing with China-based factories. In 2019, under the threat of import tariffs for products brought to the US from China, Foreman became an outspoken opponent of the Trump administration policy proposals, which would have added 10% duties to toys imported from China.

In June 2024, Basic Fun! filed for Chapter 11 bankruptcy protection. The company will use bankruptcy proceedings to repay its creditors while remaining in operation. In October 2024 the company successfully emerged from its chapter 11 restructuring with no negative financial impact on any non-equity creditors or employees or partners.

== Other ==
As a part of his career in the toy industry, Foreman has served as a board member of Licensing International, formerly known as the Licensing Industry Merchandiser's Association, and has served on the board of the Toy Industry Association, as well as its charity foundation the Toy Industry Foundation. He is also on the board of the Florence Fuller Child Development Centers and the board of trustees at the Pine Crest School.

Foreman credits his grandfather Samuel Polack as his inspiration in business. A European immigrant who came to America in the early 1900s with his mother, Sam left school to work as a coal carrier on the railroad and a copyboy at a newspaper. He later worked as a coal miner in Pennsylvania, but left the coal mines during World War II to join the US Navy. After the war, Sam went to work for the United States Bureau of Mines where he developed products and procedures for mine safety. He spent the second half of his career traveling coal country to educate miners and mine owners about new techniques in mine safety.

Foreman also credits his mother, Joyce, for inspiring him in work and ethics. Ms. Foreman started her career at the Rockwell Manufacturing Company in Pittsburgh, PA. After moving to New Jersey in the early 1960s and raising a family, she went back to work as a marketing executive at the Sperry & Hutchinson company, marketing S&H Green Stamps, and later at Citi Corp as VP of marketing for their industrial credit division.
