= Sweet Secret (disambiguation) =

Sweet Secret or Sweet Secrets may refer to:

- Dame Chocolate, a 2007 Spanish-language telenovela, also known as Sweet Secret
- Sweet Secret, a 2014-2015 South Korean television series
- Sweet Secrets, a toy introduced by Galoob in 1984
