= Sky Dancers =

Range of dolls

- Company: Galoob
- Country: USA
- Availability: 1994–present

Sky Dancers are a line of toys manufactured by Galoob which were popular in the mid-1990s and were the basis for an animated series. The toys consisted of a pullstring base and a doll with foam wings. When the doll was inserted into the base and the string was pulled, it would launch into the air and spin its wings like a propeller as it flew, similar to a helicopter.

== Toys ==
Galoob launched the toys during the 1994 Christmas season, and were greatly successful. Galoob later released a similar toyline aimed at boys, Dragon Flyz.

The toys were re-released in 2005 with an adapted design, manufactured by Play Along Toys.

=== Recall ===
Although the dolls had foam wings to prevent injury, more than 100 injuries were reported, ranging from temporary blindness to facial lacerations requiring stitches. Galoob, the manufacturer of the toys, recalled them in June 2000 after less than six years on the market; nearly 10,000,000 were recalled.

== Animated series ==
Sky Dancers
- Genre: Fantasy
- Created by: John Gentile; Anthony Gentile; Savin Yeatman
- Directed by: Frédéric Dybowski
- Voices of: Kerry O'Malley; James Michael; Andréa Burns; Donna Daley; T.J. Benjamin; Johnathan Khan Davis
- Composers: David Friedman; Carolin Petit
- Countries of origin: France; United States
- Original language: English
- No. of seasons: 1
- No. of episodes: 26 (27 in the U.S. version)

Production
- Executive producers: Marty Abrams; Marc du Pontavice; John Gentile; Anthony Gentile
- Producers: Marc du Pontavice; John Gentile; Anthony Gentile
- Editors: Xavier Franchomme; Rodolphe Ploquin; Daniel Reynes; Florence Poli
- Running time: 22 minutes
- Production companies: Gaumont Multimedia; Abrams-Gentile Entertainment; Active Entertainment

Original release
- Network: France 2 (France); Syndication (United States)
- Release: January 26 – July 26, 1996

In 1996, the toys were the basis for an animated television spin-off produced by Gaumont Multimedia in association with Abrams-Gentile Entertainment. The series premiered on France 2 on April 12, 1997, and had twenty-six episodes. The series follows five students at the High Hope Dance Academy under Queen Skyla, who work to defend the kingdom from her brother-in-law Sky Clone, who killed his brother Skyler, Skyla's husband, as revenge for him being selected as king over him, but was unable to gain control of the Sky Swirl Stone, which gave the Sky Dancers their powers.

The series had a budget of $360,000–$375,000, with an investment of $16 million from Gaumont for the production of 26 episodes of the Dragon Flyz show, with Abrams-Gentile Entertainment contributed an additional $60,000 per episode. Choreographer Mia Frye-Ressiga served as artistic consultant for the series' choreography.

=== Characters ===
- Jade (voiced by Kerry O' Malley) is a prima ballerina at High Hope Dance Academy who has the power to turn invisible. Jade gets along well with the Sky Dancers, but often argues with Slam; they have feelings for each other, but are afraid to show them. Though caring and compassionate, Jade can be stern and aggressive when she wants to prove a point and tends to not avoid verbal confrontation, though her powers lend themselves more to indirect physical confrontation. Jade is close to her father, a scientist who raised her mostly by himself after her mother, who had been teaching her to dance, decided to become a professional ballerina and left her family. Jade has brown eyes and long black hair with an orange streak which she often wears in a ponytail and wears a fuchsia dress and white boots. As a Sky Dancer, she has fuchsia wings and wears a pink and white outfit.
- Slam (voiced by James Michael) is High Hope Dance Academy's "Hero of Hip Hop" and controls the gravity beam in the Sky Realm. While he lacks the focus, interest, and patience for traditional dance classes, he excels at breakdancing and hip-hop. Slam is egotistical, reckless, and competitive and hates ties, claiming that "the only thing a tie means is that I didn't win". He is also blunt, often coming across as insensitive and lacking empathy. Despite this, Slam is loyal to his friends and is always there for them. Throughout the series, he is shown to have feelings for Jade, but his "tough guy" exterior and their frequent arguments hold him back, as do their different personalities and tastes in dance and music. Little is known about Slam's family or past; it is implied that his finances are directly tied to his mother's, and that he sees himself as the only person in his neighborhood who can make it big. As a Sky Dancer, he has spiky red hair and black and yellow wings.
- Angelica (voiced by Andréa Burns) is High Hope Dance Academy's "Queen of Country Rock" and leader of the Sky Dancers, and has the power to temporarily stop time. She is optimistic and often flirts with Breeze and becomes jealous when another girl flirts with him. Angelica is somewhat spoiled by her parents and her love for dancing late at night clubs often gets her into trouble. Her cardinal rules are "Never miss a rehearsal, a dance step, or a jammin' party!" Angelica has blonde hair with pink streaks.
- Camille (voiced by Donna Daley) is High Hope Dance Academy's "Modern Dance Aficionado" and has the power to create any shape out of clouds. Her parents, who work as lawyers, do not approve of her dancing, and she is reluctant to tell them that she wants to follow her dreams instead of following in their footsteps. She is responsible and smart and often acts as the group's voice of reason, but can seem overly dramatic due to taking her relationships seriously. While forgiving and generous, she is not afraid to stand up for herself and her friends. Camille has curly brown hair with a blue streak that she wears in a ponytail.
- Breeze (voiced by T.J. Benjamin) is a Native American who has the power to control wind and nature. He is romantically involved with Angelica throughout the series, often flirting with her and complimenting her. He is quiet and shy and is the most level-headed member of the group. While he does not get into many arguments, when he does, he takes them personally. Little is known about Breeze's family. His tribe seems to have some degree of reserve land for ceremonies, and Breeze mentions that his grandmother lives in Chicago. He also states that he feels he has been gifted with the wisdom of his late grandfather. Breeze attended Lincoln High School and later puts on a free performance for them.
- Queen Skyla (voiced by Donna Daley) is the queen of the Wingdom and the dance headmistress of High Hope Dance Academy, where she is known as Dame Skyla. She is Skyler's wife and Sky Clone's sister-in-law. On Earth, she has blonde hair and wears a green dress, and in the Sky Realm her hair has pink and blue streaks and she wears a white and green dress. Whirl and Twirl have been her pets since childhood; as a child, she grew up in the palace with Skyler and Sky Clone, though her connection to the royal family is unclear, but as a teenager she was called "Princess Skyla", suggesting that she is a ward of the royal family. She often mourns her husband Skyler, who Sky Clone supposedly killed.
- Sky Clone (voiced by Johnathan Khan Davis) is Skyla's brother-in-law and Skyler's older brother and the main villain of the series. He is determined to defeat the Sky Dancers and take over the Sky Realm. He killed Skyler as revenge for him being selected as king over him, and now seeks revenge against the Sky Realm because Skyler took his flight.
- King Skyler is Skyla's husband and Sky Clone's younger brother, who sacrificed himself to use the Death Spin to defeat him and take away his flight. While he was presumed dead, it is later revealed that he is not dead, but trapped in another dimension. He is often seen in Skyla's flashbacks, and often comes to her aid when she is in danger.
- Whirl and Twirl are Skyla's canine companions, who can use their ears to fly. They are white dogs that respectively have green and red hair along with their eye color.
- Muddle, Jumble (voiced by Donna Daley) and Snarl (voiced by Thomas Cannizzaro) are Sky Clone's minions.
- Caroline (voiced by Donna Daley) is a high school reporter dedicated to "getting the story". She falls in love with Breeze after meeting him at a school carnival, causing bad feelings between her and Angelica. After she follows the Sky Dancers into the Sky Realm, she annoys them by trying to interview them. After Sky Clone kidnaps her, he also gets annoyed with her and lets her go to get rid of her.
- The Tinker is Queen Skyla's friend, who aids the Sky Dancers by providing them with information and through his skills as a tinker.
- Brandon is a student at High Hope Dance Academy who is egotistical and enjoys playing pranks on the other students and is paid to trick Slam into quitting the academy.
- King Skyhawk is Sky Clone and Skyler's father and the former king of the Sky Realm. The Sky Dancers meet him when they travel back in time and he hires them as companions for Sky Clone, Skyler and Skyla. Skyhawk is very kind and trusting, and Skyler bears a strong resemblance to him.

=== Episodes ===
No.	Title	Written by	Original release date
1	"The Sky's the Limit"	John Gentile; Anthony Gentile; Lisa Morton; Jack Olesker	January 26, 1996
Skyla recruits the five top dancers at High Hope Dance Academy to become Sky Dancers and defend the Wingdom.
2	"On Wings Of Song"	Lisa Morton; John Gentile; Anthony Gentile; Savin Yeatman	February 2, 1996
Sky Clone's imps steal a harp which gives flight to inhabitants of the Skyridium and the Sky Dancers must retrieve it.
3	"Broken Stone"	Jack Olesker; Savin Yeatman	February 9, 1996
Slam and Jade break the stone on Queen Skyla's glove, removing the Sky Dancers' ability to fly. They must find a way to fix it before Sky Clone destroys the Wingdom.
4	"Getting the Story"	Jack Olesker; Savin Yeatman	February 16, 1996
An obnoxious reporter with a crush on Breeze accidentally gets brought along to Sky Hive, and Sky Dancers must keep their identities a secret.
5	"Lonely Heart"	Anthony Gentile; John Gentile; Jack Olesker	February 23, 1996
When the Sky Dancers try to cheer Skyla on the anniversary of Skyler's death spin, Sky Clone absconds with Skyla and the Sky Swirl Stone to the Nether World.
6	"A Friend in High Places"	Anthony Gentile; John Gentile; Steven Harris; Ron Harris	March 1, 1996
Sky Clone sends singing Horrorcanes to the Wingdom to disrupt the harmony and they blow the Sky Dancers back home. NOTE: This episode is unique to the U.S. version, with scenes from other episodes spliced together and newly dubbed.
7	"Dance Jade, Dance"	Jack Olesker; Savin Yeatman	March 8, 1996
The Sky Dancers take lessons from Rudolph Fareev, who, it turns out, would rather insult them than teach them. The Sky Dancers must uncover his motives in time to save a love-struck Jade and foil Sky Clone's latest plan.
8	"Love Lost, Love Found"	Jack Olesker; Savin Yeatman	March 15, 1996
Jade's long-estranged mother reenters her life the day before Skyla falls prey to Sky Clone's trap at a Skyridium harp performance.
9	"The Last Dance"	Jack Olesker; Savin Yeatman	March 22, 1996
Sky Clone teams up with the shape-shifter Gorp to destroy the Sky Dancers, who are in the Wingdom for Camille to teach her dance, the "Minuease", to Skyla's subjects.
10	"Skyler vs. Skyler"	Pascal Pinteau; Jack Olesker; Savin Yeatman	March 29, 1996
Sky Clone uses the power of science to make himself look and sound like King Skyler, but Angelica learns the truth and she tries to convince the rest of the Wingdom about his criminal plan despite being declared a fugitive.
11	"Spread Your Wings"	Jack Olesker; Savin Yeatman	April 5, 1996
When Angelica is injured on a skiing trip, she loses confidence in herself and decides to quit the Sky Dancers. The Tinker has to find a way to restore Angelica's confidence and help the now outnumbered Sky Dancers to fend off Sky Clone's latest attack.
12	"Time and Again"	Pascal Pinteau; Jack Olesker; Savin Yeatman	April 12, 1996
The Sky Dancers fool around with the Sky Swirl Stone and accidentally transport themselves to the Wingdom's past, when Skyla, Skyler, and Sky Clone were teens.
13	"Statues"	Brigitte Bouvier; Lisa Morton; Savin Yeatman	April 19, 1996
Angelica's all-night partying leads her to sleep, while the imps turn all of the Wingdom's inhabitants, including Queen Skyla, to stone. Angelica must find a way to lead the Sky Dancers on a raid of the Nether World for the antidote.
14	"Blue Heaven"	Pascal Pinteau; Lisa Morton; Savin Yeatman	April 26, 1996
Sky Clone makes use of an ancient prophecy to appear as Azure's heaven-sent leader, whom the realm's inhabitants have expected for generations. The Sky Dancers have to figure out how Sky Clone managed to mimic the legend, while also saving Skyla from her sudden strange illness and prevent a Wingdom-wide war.
15	"The Alliance"	Jack Olesker; Savin Yeatman	May 3, 1996
None of the girls want to dance with Brandon, an arrogant student assigned to their group for the academy's final paired dance show. This leads to a massive fight between the girls just as the three Harpies of the Wingdom arise from their thousand year sleep to spread terror across the Sky Kingdom. The girls must stop their fighting in order to save the day.
16	"Forever Love"	Lisa Morton; Savin Yeatman	May 10, 1996
The Sky Dancers form a plan to bring King Skyler back, but this act might cost their lives and the Wingdom.
17	"The Imp's Trap"	Pascal Pinteau; Jack Olesker; Savin Yeatman	May 17, 1996
Slam and Camille give up their schooling for roles in a high budget, big name film. Meanwhile, the imps are left unsupervised, and Jumble goes mad with power.
18	"Long Live Sky Clone!"	Pascal Pinteau; Jack Olesker; Savin Yeatman	May 24, 1996
Slam's ego threatens to break up the Sky Dancers, while Sky Clone's Maelstrom Mixture threatens to break up the Wingdom.
19	"Where's My Body?"	Lisa Morton; Savin Yeatman	May 31, 1996
Sky Clone creates a new invention that can make two people switch bodies. When the Sky Dancers scramble to protect Sky Hive, Sky Clone switches bodies with Slam. Hip Hop tries to convince his friends that he is not Sky Clone and to get his own body back.
20	"Moment of Truth"	Pascal Pinteau; Lisa Morton; Savin Yeatman	June 7, 1996
The Baroness Skyvia's long-buried jealousy for Skyla resurfaces and leads her to hatch an assassination plot with Sky Clone.
21	"Heartbreak"	Pascal Pinteau; Jack Olesker; Savin Yeatman	June 14, 1996
Devastated by her latest break-up, Camille buries her sorrows in comfort food. In the Sky Realm, Sky Clone gets hold of Azure's Organ and puts it out of tune, allowing him to control the population. Camille is unaffected by his control and tries to find a way to free them and prevent a war.
22	"Troublemakers"	Jack Olesker; Savin Yeatman	June 21, 1996
Breeze invites the Sky Dancers to his tribe's celebration in the desert. Angelica flirts her head off, but Breeze puts her off. Meanwhile, in the Sky Kingdom, the three imps disguise themselves and create havoc in each realm, leading each sky city to close its borders.
23	"Dark Star"	Lisa Morton; Savin Yeatman	June 28, 1996
The Academy's Christmas show is delayed when Sky Clone attacks the Wingdom with the Sky Swirl Stone's legendary, malevolent counterpart. All the Sky Dancers are neutralized except Camille, whose disapproving parents are waiting at High Hope. Skyla eventually sneaks away from the school's audience to challenge Sky Clone to duel.
24	"Slam Bang"	Pascal Pinteau; Jack Olesker; Savin Yeatman	July 5, 1996
Slam falls in with Brandon and aids him in wreaking havoc on the academy, leading to their expulsion. The Sky Dancers leave without Slam for the Wingdom, where Sky Clone manages to steal the Sky Swirl Stone. When Slam finds out that Brandon was paid by a rival academy headmaster to bring him to their school, he races back to High Hope to try to help his friends.
25	"Treasure Cloud"	Pascal Pinteau; Jack Olesker; Savin Yeatman	July 12, 1996
When High Hope Dance Academy is destroyed by a hurricane, Skyla has to find a way to pay for repairs. She brings the Sky Dancers to the Wingdom to retrieve money from the royal treasury, only to find that the Wingdom is broke. An ancient map leads them on a treasure hunt to find the funds they need, but Sky Clone is determined to beat them for the prize.
26	"The Purple Tide of Skyridium"	Jack Olesker; Savin Yeatman	July 19, 1996
Sky Clone goes to Skyridium and forces the local population to build him an immense pyramid to replace the Den. The Sky Dancers and Skyla try to stop Sky Clone, but he uses a new weapon against them, which is a giant purple Horrorcane exhaling poison gas. Additionally, Slam and Breeze get into an argument about using a field full of wildlife for a concert.
27	"The Operation"	Lisa Morton; Savin Yeatman	July 26, 1996
During a performance at the High Hope Dance Academy, Angelica slips and hurts her knee badly. She undergoes emergency surgery but has to wait for the surgeon to know whether or not she will be able to dance again. The Sky Dancers take turns to remind her of past adventures to keep her spirits up.

=== UK VHS releases ===
VHS title	Release date	Episodes
Sky Dancers: The Sky's the Limit and 2 Other Episodes (VC1425)	14 October 1996	"The Sky's the Limit", "On Wings of Song", "Broken Stone"
Sky Dancers: Getting the Story/Lonely Heart/Dance, Jade, Dance (VC1442)	14 July 1997	"Getting the Story", "Lonely Heart", "Dance, Jade, Dance"

== Other materials ==
In 1997, Sky Dancers had a children's book series based on it. A board game was also made, which is seemingly based on promotional material or earlier drafts of the series. In 2005, a game was released for the Game Boy Advance.
