= Camp Beverly Hills =

Defunct American clothing line

- Type: Private
- Industry: Fashion
- Founded: 1977
- Founder: Jeffrey A. Stein, John H. Lasker
- Defunct: 2022
- Fate: Closed when distributer failed
- Headquarters: United States
- Area served: United States
- Products: Clothing
- Website: campbeverlyhills.com

Camp Beverly Hills was an American clothing line founded by Jeffrey A. Stein and John H. Lasker and Howard Himelstein. The brand launched in 1977 and became a pop-culture phenomenon during the 1980s. The clothing was known for its pastel colors and casual comfortable style. After a couple of revivals in 2004 and again in 2020, the brand was closed down around 2024 when its exclusive reseller Fred Segal closed.

The brand was acquired by Florida-based entrepreneur Jay Foreman in the late 2010s. Camp Beverly Hills vintage clothing line announced in 2020 that it is relaunching the brand. The brand would be sold via pop-up activations at Fred Segal stores and their online storefront until its closure.

== History ==
Beverly Hills' glitzy name has helped Camp Beverly Hills turn its fashion products into money-making ventures. The brand began in 1977 as an inexpensive alternative to the boutiques of Beverly Hills. The brand's first retail store was located on a side street just off Rodeo Drive and became an overnight sensation, soon leading to a celebrity obsession.

During the next decade, the line became popular after introducing some of the first casual clothing to use pastel colors. It expanded to be sold in major retailers, and grew their licenses to include apparel, accessories, footwear, fragrances, eyewear, and home textiles.

=== Brand relaunches ===
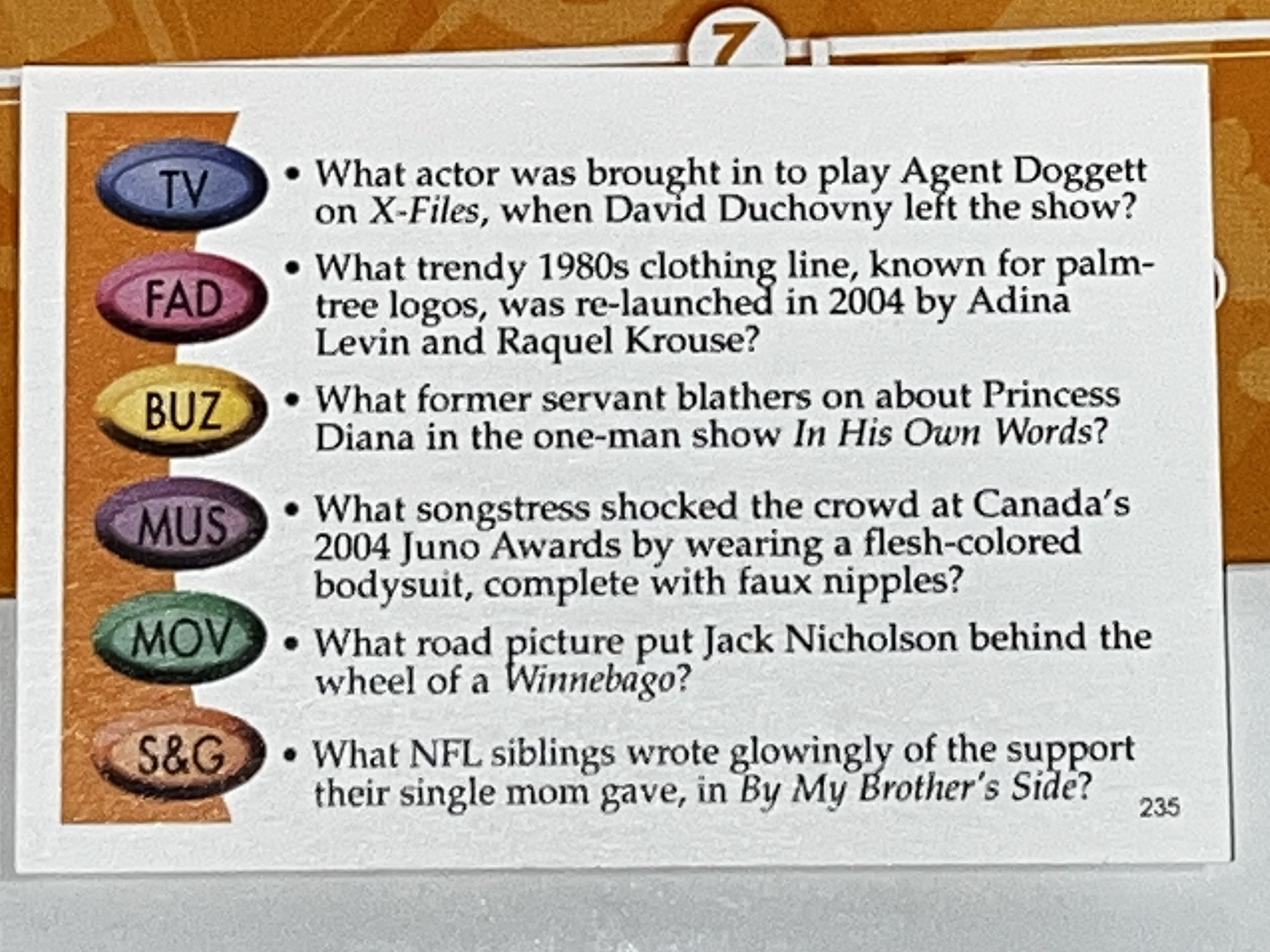
Question Number 235 in the Fad Category of Trivial Pursuit Pop Culture

In 2004 the brand was relaunched by Adina Levin and Raquel Krouse. The relaunch featured vintage style casual apparel and launched at Scoop on the East Coast and Ron Herman on the West Coast.

Due to a wave of 1980s nostalgia in the 2020s, the brand announced a relaunch in 2020, led by co-owner Jay Foreman. Forman has a history of retailing nostalgic brands as the CEO of Basic Fun!, and relaunching other iconic 80s brands such as Care Bears and Tonka. The line will be tapping into its LA roots and is to be sold exclusively at Fred Segal stores and on fredsegal.com in Spring 2021. The exclusive capsule collection and pop-up activation will recreate elements of the original Camp Beverly Hills store. After the launch, the brand planned to seek licensing partners to take it into wider national distribution in 2022 and beyond. However, with the failure of its exclusive distributor in 2024 this plan did not succeed.
