= Britney Spears doll =

Celebrity doll

The Britney Spears doll is a celebrity doll made in the likeness of American pop singer Britney Spears. Several versions of the doll were released. Each doll is dressed in costumes that resemble the clothing Spears had worn in concerts, appearances, and music videos. The Britney Spears doll was the first doll produced by Play Along Toys.

== History ==
=== The doll ===
Jay Foreman and Charlie Emby, the founders of Play Along Toys, spent millions of dollars to license, advertise, and distribute the Britney Spears dolls. In 1999, Play Along Toys released the Britney Spears Fashion Doll; the Britney Doll was notable, as it was the first product Play Along Toys ever released. The dolls feature Spears in different outfits, make-up, and hairstyles from her concerts, appearances, photoshoots and music videos. The packaging the dolls were sold in often contained CDs of individual songs, stickers, and other accessories.

At the same time Play Along Toys released the first Britney Doll, Yaboom Toys released their own version of the popular toy. The Singing Character, fashioned as Spears, plays a full-length version of one of Spear's popular songs when a button on the doll's stomach is pressed. The doll arrived on toy store shelves just in time for the holidays in 2000.

A porcelain version of the Britney Doll was also released. The doll wears the classic outfit worn by Spears in the "...Baby One More Time" music video and is accompanied by a stand for easy display.

=== Popularity ===
On October 15, 1999, the first Britney Spears Doll was released. The initial doll sold over 800,000 units. To date, over 5 million of the assorted Britney Dolls have been sold. According to the Winnipeg Free Press, the doll is the second best-selling celebrity doll of all time, behind only the Spice Girls dolls.

The first time Spears saw the doll she was displeased with its looks. She asked that the doll be changed because she felt it had the appearance of a bulldog chewing a wasp. As Spears reasoned, I felt a bit bad about ordering changes but hey, it's my doll. Following the changes to the doll's face, the dolls sold out in the United States in December. In the United Kingdom, three weeks of sales resulted in 60,000 dolls being sold.

Production of the doll was later discontinued sometime in late 2001 or early 2002. Years after the doll’s discontinuation, it has become a collector's item among her fans and doll collectors, usually sold on eBay.

== List of products ==
=== ...Baby One More Time Dolls ===
This collection is composed of three dolls fashioning costumes from music videos from 1999. One wears the clothing from Spears' "...Baby One More Time" music video, two wear ensembles resembling those worn in the "(You Drive Me) Crazy" music video, and the last wear an outfit from the "Sometimes" music video.

- School Girl (outfit from "...Baby One More Time" music videos)
- Flowing White (outfit from "Sometimes" music videos)
- Pink Waitress (outfit from "(You Drive Me) Crazy" music videos)

=== Oops!... I Did It Again Dolls ===
This collection is composed of seven dolls (two dolls in other packaging) from two music videos by Britney Spears from 2000.

- Black & White (outfit from "Oops!... I Did It Again" music videos)
- White Leather (outfit from "Oops!... I Did It Again" music videos)
- Red Cat Jumpsuit (outfit from "Oops!... I Did It Again" music videos)
- Green Top (outfit from "Lucky" music videos)
- Red Top (outfit from "Lucky" music videos)

=== Video performance collection dolls ===
This collection contains two dolls in different outfits from Spears' "Born to Make You Happy" music video, along with the outfit from her performance at the 1999 MTV Video Music Awards.

- Red & Black (outfit from "Born to Make You Happy" music videos)
- Silver Sequined Disco Dive (outfit from "Born to Make You Happy" music videos)
- Green & Black (outfit from "(You Drive Me) Crazy" music videos)
- Shine Grey Sequined Disco Diva (outfit from 1999 MTV Video Music Awards performance)
- Futuristic (outfit from "Stronger" music videos)
- Red Cat Jumpsuit (outfit from "Oops!... I Did It Again" music videos)

=== Video collection dolls ===
- Green top (outfit from "Lucky" music videos)
- Red top (outfit from "Lucky" music videos)
- Pink top (outfit from "I'm a Slave 4 U" music videos)
- Ripped top (outfit from "I'm a Slave 4 U" music videos)
- Futuristic (outfit from "Stronger" music videos)
- White top (outfit from "I'm Not a Girl, Not Yet a Woman" music videos)
- Red cat jumpsuit (outfit from "Oops!... I Did It Again" music videos)
- Crossroads (outfit from Crossroads film)

=== Concert outfit dolls ===
This collection contains seven dolls wears different clothing that Britney Spears wore on stage during her Oops!... I Did It Again Tour.

- Silver cowboy outfit
- Navy sailor outfit
- Pink dress outfit
- Purple jumpsuit outfit
- Fire top outfit
- Elvis Presley jumpsuit outfit
- White Cat top outfit

=== Other outfit Dolls ===
- 1999 MTV VMAS (silver crop top and trousers)
- 1999 EMA AWARDS (Red dress)
