= Play Along Toys =

American toy company

- Industry: Toys
- Founded: 1999
- Founder: Charlie Emby; Jay Foreman; Larry Geller
- Defunct: 2009
- Fate: Acquired by Jakks Pacific, eventually closed down
- Headquarters: Deerfield Beach, Florida, United States
- Owner: Jakks Pacific (2004-2009)

Play Along Toys was an American toy company, which was last operating as a wholly owned division of Jakks Pacific. The company was headquartered in Deerfield Beach, Florida, in the Miami metropolitan area, and was best known for its celebrity dolls and revivals of older toy lines.

== History ==
In 1999, the founders of Play Along (among them Charlie Emby, Jay Foreman, and Larry Geller) chose the Britney Spears Doll line as the first licensing venture with their new company. This was followed by other celebrity dolls including Aaron Carter, Venus Williams, Serena Williams and Mandy Moore. In 2001, Play Along partnered with toy design studio Art Asylum for production of the studio's toys. In 2002, Play Along brought back one of the plush doll lines from the 1980s, the Care Bears. This brand was awarded "License of the Year 2002" by the Licensing Industry Merchandisers' Association (LIMA).

As the company's toy lines continued to grow, so did the Play Along team, having grown from a staff of five into a company with more than 100 employees, both in the U.S. and Hong Kong, producing toys for multiple brands including the Care Bears, The Dog and Friends, The Lord of the Rings: Armies of Middle-earth, The Cat in the Hat, Teletubbies, Curly Q's, Doodle Bear, Sky Dancers and the Cabbage Patch Kids.

Jakks Pacific acquired the privately owned company in 2004, and Play Along ran as a division within Jakks. In the same year, the company relaunched a line of Cabbage Patch Kids.

In Fall of 2007, Play Along released dolls and playsets based on Disney Channel TV series, Hannah Montana, and film, the Cheetah Girls. The lines were popular during the Christmas season. As of Fall 2008, more products have been added onto the Hannah Montana line, including the 2008 Holiday Popstar doll and Malibu Beach House playset; also, dolls based on the Disney Channel film, Camp Rock, were launched. In 2009, the last doll line was made and the company closed.

== Products ==
=== 1999 ===
- Britney Spears dolls
- Sabrina: The Animated Series dolls
- Bruce Lee/Enter the Dragon
- Bubble gum
- Venus Williams and Serena Williams dolls
- V.I.P. dolls

=== 2000 ===
- Mandy Moore doll
- Sisqó doll

=== 2001 ===
- Aaron Carter doll
- Precious Moments
- Lisa Frank
- A*Teens dolls
- Dream dolls
- 2gether dolls
- LFO dolls

=== 2002 ===
- Care Bears
- Spy Kids

=== 2004 ===
- Cabbage Patch Kids
- Doodle Bear/Doodle Monster (discontinued in 2008)
- The Lord of the Rings (2004 only)
- Teletubbies

=== 2005 ===
- Sky Dancers
- Dragon Flyz

=== 2006 ===
- Domo
- Puppy in My Pocket
- Speed Stacks (discontinued in 2008)
- Monster in My Pocket (discontinued in 2010)

=== 2007 ===
- Cheetah Girls dolls (2007 only)
- Hairspray dolls (2007 only)
- Hannah Montana dolls
- Barney
- Play Along Club (2007 only)
- Sweet Secrets (discontinued in 2008)

=== 2008 ===
- Camp Rock dolls
- The Chronicles of Narnia: Prince Caspian
- Clifford
- Curious George
- Miffy
- NASCAR
- Taylor Swift doll
- The Wiggles
- SpongeBob SquarePants

=== 2009 ===
- Hannah Montana: The Movie dolls
