= Sweet Secrets =

Toy introduced by Galoob in 1984

Sweet Secrets was a toy introduced by Galoob in 1984 which transformed from jewelry, makeup and other girl-oriented objects to animals, girls with hair, and playsets. This was done by opening the object and unfolding the head, arms, and legs. The playsets included a jewelry box which transformed into a dollhouse, a play phone which transformed into a nursery, a comb which transformed into a bed, and a photo frame which transformed into a pool. In Fall 2007, Play Along Toys re-released the Sweet Secrets series, but instead of charms, they were tiny dolls that could fit into lipstick tubes and change purses.

== Charms ==
- Shimmer
- Dazzle
- Starshine
- Cat Trina
- Starburst (Horse)
- Starshine
- Puppy Shines Blue plastic heart with red "gemstone"; changes into puppy
- Pinkie Panda Lavender octagon with golden "gemstone"; changes into panda
- Star Beam
- Sparkle Heart
- Cristal Bright
- Glitter Miss
- Shinie Mouse
- Glitter Kitty

== Vanity Sets ==
- Brush~Car

== Comb bed ==
- Flashie charm

== Fashion Sets ==
=== Hairdryer~Patio ===
- Shinie charm

=== Jewelry Box~House ===
- Purse Playpark
