= Dragon Flyz =

French-American animated television series

- Genre: Action-adventure; Drama; Fantasy; Science fiction
- Created by: John Gentile; Anthony Gentile; Savin Yeatman
- Developed by: Savin Yeatman
- Written by: Savin Yeatman
- Directed by: Xavier Giacometti
- Voices of: T. J. Benjamin; Saul Bernstein; Thomas Cannizzaro; Donna Daley; Johnathan Davis; Don Mayo; James Michael; K. C. Noel; Jimmy Uncle
- Theme music composer: John Carney
- Composer: David Friedman
- Countries of origin: France; United States
- Original language: English
- No. of seasons: 1
- No. of episodes: 26

Production
- Executive producers: Marc du Pontavice; Marty Abrams; John Gentile; Anthony Gentile
- Producer: Marc du Pontavice
- Editors: Xavier Franchomme; Rodolphe Ploquin
- Running time: 22 minutes
- Production companies: Gaumont Multimedia; Active Entertainment; Columbia TriStar Television

Original release
- Network: France 3 (France); Syndication (United States)
- Release: September 14, 1996 – March 8, 1997

Dragon Flyz is an animated television series created by Savin Yeatman and produced by Gaumont Multimedia in association with Abrams/Gentile Entertainment. The show, based on a toy line by Galoob, ran for two seasons, in syndication in the United States and Europe, from 1996 to 1997. 26 episodes were produced.

The series, set in a world following an event called the Cataclysm follows the Dragonators, who ride on dragons in search and rescue operations.

The series had a budget of $360,000–$375,000, with an investment of $16 million from Gaumont for the production of 26 episodes of the Sky Dancers show, with Abrams-Gentile Entertainment contributed an additional $60,000 per episode. David Perlmutter's Encyclopedia of American Animated Television Shows calls Dragon Flyz "a very transparent ad for a toy line, much like some of the other productions the Abrams/Gentile Studio was involved in at this time (see Happy Ness: The Secret of the Loch and Van-Pires for other examples)." In his 2022 autobiography, Destin animé, Marc du Pontavice called the series "forgettable".

== Plot and setting ==
The setting is a post-apocalyptic version of the 41st century. The disaster responsible for the world's state is called the Cataclysm and is implied to have been caused by nuclear warfare. The Cataclysm caused the extinction of most of the Earth's inhabitants, ecosystems, and species. The planet's surface has become barren and volcanic, with rivers of lava running across the surface. The surface world is mostly uninhabitable, with the exception of animals which have adapted to the environment. The surviving human population lives in the floating city of Airlandis.

The series follows the adventures of the dragon-riders as they fight for world domination. The riders are either human or belong to a race resembling reptiles, gargoyles, and demons. From Airlandis, the Dragonators regularly travel to the surface to retrieve amber, which is used as a source of fuel and is usually obtained from lava pools or directly from the ground. It is also shown that some humans escaped the Cataclysm aboard a space station, on which the protagonists' mother now resides. They are often threatened by lightning storms, air currents, and acidic clouds called Warp Winds, through which the only safe passages are hollow mountains called Wind Pits. Despite the Cataclysm, some life survived due to being sheltered in an oasis: a pocket of life where the planet's former species live in safety.

Airlandis is a floating city with five biospheres at its center, each simulating a different natural habitat and preserving the species rescued from the Cataclysm. The city's most important region is its power core, which is operated by the engineer Orac. Airlandis also has a runway for the Dragonators, an aviary where the dragons reside when not being used for flight, a chamber where matters of government are negotiated, Skywatch, where a team maintains the city's systems and monitors the skies, and a prison.

== Characters ==
The main characters ride dragons for travel and combat, but also have the ability to fly short distances. The Dragonators use dragonfly-like wings known as exo-wings that sprout from the backplate of their armor, while Dreadwing and his minions, the Dramen, sprout membranous wings from their shoulders. Both types of wings disappear when not in use. The Dragonators' primary weapon is the Wind Jammer, a wrist-mounted weapon, while Dreadwing and the Dramen wield glove-like cannons.

=== Humans ===
==== Z'neth ====
- Callsign: Dragonator One
- Armor Color: Cerulean
- Dragon Steed: Riptor

The leader of the Dragonators and the eldest of the four siblings, who values honor and integrity.

==== Summit ====
- Callsign: Dragonator Two
- Armor Color: Forest green
- Dragon Steed: Sky-Fury

The second-eldest sibling. He is known for his witty remarks, short temper, and preference for physical strength.

==== Apex ====
- Callsign: Dragonator Three
- Armor Color: Silver
- Dragon Steed: Blazewind

The third-oldest sibling. She prefers negotiation to conflict, and has telepathic abilities that allow her to communicate with dragons and partially manipulate half-dragons, such as Dramen. When using her powers, her eyes and those of her subject, glow silver.

==== Peak ====
- Callsign: Dragonator Four
- Armor Color: Orange/purple
- Dragon Steed: Wingstorm

The youngest and most reckless of the siblings. He enjoys stunt-flying on dragons, which often gets him in trouble, and is egotistical and mischievous.

==== Amod ====
- Callsign: Dragonator Five
- Armor Color: Brown
- Dragon Steed: Titan

A member of the Dragon Flyz and Peak's friend. He is skilled in battle, but initially disrespectful to dragons.

==== Zarkan ====
- Callsign: Dragonator Six
- Armor Color: Black
- Dragon Steed: Thunder

A soldier of the Dragon Flyz who aids the Dragonators.

==== Nora ====
- Callsign: Dragonator Nine
- Armor Color: Light blue
- Dragon Steed: Unnamed

The second female Dragonator in Airlandis, who Peak has a crush on, and who fights alongside the other Dragonators.

==== Aaron ====
- Armor Color: Red

The father of the four siblings, who often acts as their advisor. He has no use of his legs and is therefore unable to walk, instead hovering above the ground. This is implied to be controlled by his staff, which has an Amber crystal. He is the strongest advocate on Airlandis's ruling council for finding a new place to live.

==== Orac ====
An engineer who maintains Airlandis' power generator.

==== Councillor Joshua ====
A ranking member of Airlandis' governing parliament, who often takes opposition to Aaron's position. Though his intentions are for the good of the populace, his impatience ultimately leads him to place Summit in prison, allowing Dreadwing control of Airlandis.

=== Mutants ===
==== Dreadwing ====
- Dragon Steed: Blackheart

The main antagonist of the series, who lives in a crashed ship known as Warnado and commands a faction of Dramen.

==== Nocturna ====
- Dragon Steed: Cyclaws

Dreadwing's second-in-command, who serves him in exchange for a domain of her own. When Dreadwing offers her the Oasis in exchange for her continued loyalty, she accepts, but is angered when he destroys it. It is implied that she has a crush on Z'neth, as she is willing to ally herself with the Dragonators and help them at times.

==== Fryte ====
- Dragon Steed: Skunk

A servant of Dreadwing, who is unquestioningly loyal to him. Like Nocturna, his dragon steed resembles him.

==== Gangryn ====
- Dragon Steed: Unnamed

A mutant scientist who serves Dreadwing, but has his own ambitions and is willing to change allegiances for his own sake.

==== The Gremwings ====
Gremwings are bipedal, insect-like creatures who serve Dreadwing; they have great strength and come in hordes. Other species include a monocular, batlike species which serves to gather information and a similar species that feeds on blood.

==== The Dramen ====
- Dragon Steed: Unnamed

The Dramen are large, gargoyle-like humanoids that can sprout wings from their bodies. Dreadwing's Dramen are sometimes seen supporting him and his lieutenants and riding dragons.

==== Dram ====
- Callsign: None
- Armor Color: Dark brown
- Dragon Steed: Titan

A Dramen who Aaron raised after his village was mysteriously destroyed, and his loyalty to them has caused other Dramen to call him a traitor, much to his resentment. Although he has a dragon steed, Dram prefers to fly himself.

==== Vydak ====
The tribal leader of a clan of Dark Dramen who destroyed Dram's village and killed his family, and later enslaved another clan. In his first appearance, Dreadwing attempts to form an alliance with him, but this fails when Dram attempts to rescue the enslaved villagers. In his second appearance, his warriors meet with Dreadwing's army in a canyon before attacking Airlandis, but are unaware that their leaders are plotting to betray each other.

=== Dragons ===
There are three type of dragons that appear in the series. The most common are the Airlandian dragons, which have smooth-skinned, serpentine bodies, long, slender necks and tails, needle-like teeth, and pterosaur-like wings on which they can walk. The second type is a large-bodied, four-legged breed with short necks that Fryte, Kreigo and Nocturna ride. The third type, of which Blackheart is the only example in the series, has characteristics of both types, but is larger and has the ability to consume lava and breathe fire. All dragons are intelligent and seem to understand human speech, and are loyal to their riders. When not on duty, Airlandian dragons live in a vast, hangarlike station consisting of nesting areas and a terraformed environment, including a lake.

==== Riptor ====
Z'Neth's dragon, a blue dragon with a nasal horn and two large crests. An Arlandian dragon, he is considered the leader of the dragons, as evidenced by his larger nest, collar, and crest armor. Riptor has a personal rivalry with Blackheart and is one of only two dragons and the only Airlandian dragon that can match his power.

==== Sky Fury ====
Summit's dragon, a green dragon with two brown horns. She is the only female among the protagonists' steeds and will not hesitate to take action, even without being given a command.

==== Fury's Cub ====
A small green dragon born early in the series. While still an egg, Nocturna, sent by Dreadwing to capture dragon eggs for Gangryn's genetic experiments, steals him from Fury to use in those experiments. As a result, he has the ability to project a paralyzing blast when he hatches. Dreadwing attempts to use this ability as a weapon, but fails when Sky Fury convinces him to join her.

==== Wing Storm ====
Peak's dragon, a young, steel-gray dragon with a spiky head and a long mouth. Both Wing Storm and Peak are reckless, though Wing Storm is the more cautious of the two.

==== Blazewind ====
Apex's dragon, a white dragon with a black mane. Blazewind is closer to his rider than others because of Apex's ability to communicate telepathically.

==== Blackheart ====
Dreadwing's dragon. A massive four-legged, long-necked, dragon with red scales and the ability to consume lava and breathe fire. Riptor is his rival and is his equal in power, but he was once defeated by the leader of a pack of wild dragons who could also breathe fire.

== Episodes ==
The first three episodes were released as a stand-alone movie titled Dragon Flyz: The Legend Begins on December 3, 1996.

No.	Title	Written by	Original release date
1	"The Legend Begins"	Savin Yeatman; John Gentile (part 1); Anthony Gentile (part 1); David Toney (parts 2–3)	September 14, 1996 September 21, 1996 September 28, 1996
2	"The Legend Begins"	Savin Yeatman; John Gentile (part 1); Anthony Gentile (part 1); David Toney (parts 2–3)	September 14, 1996 September 21, 1996 September 28, 1996
3	"The Legend Begins"	Savin Yeatman; John Gentile (part 1); Anthony Gentile (part 1); David Toney (parts 2–3)	September 14, 1996 September 21, 1996 September 28, 1996
Part 1: Dragon Dawn: As the Dragonators search for Amber, the Gremwings capture Peak and Dreadwing holds him hostage, and his siblings fight to rescue him. Part 2: The Day of the Dragon: After a flight, Summit learns that Sky Fury is a mother. During an attack on Airlandis, her egg is stolen and taken to Warnado, where Gangryn modifies it, but Fury and the Dragonators rescue it. Part 3: Darkness Bound: Investigation of a wreck brings the Dragonators, Dreadwing, and a faction of surface-dwelling Dark Dramen into a stand-off. After the Dragonators escape, Dreadwing negotiates a treaty with the Dark Dramen's leader, Kreigo, and attacks Airlandis with him. When Nocturna betrays Kreigo, the Dragonators return him to his followers in exchange for a record of the wreck's arrival.
4	"Son of Dread"	David Toney; Savin Yeatman	October 5, 1996
While he is on the surface, Dreadwing captures Z'neth and drugs him to believe he is his son in order to turn him against the Dragonators.
5	"Amber King"	Peter Stone; Savin Yeatman	October 12, 1996
The Dragonators encounter a group of wild dragons, including one that can turn rock into Amber. Apex negotiates with them using her telepathy, but her efforts are threatened when Dreadwing attacks.
6	"Crystal Fire"	David Toney; Savin Yeatman	October 19, 1996
Gangryn discovers a crystal compound similar to Amber that expands uncontrollably when exposed to sunlight, which Dreadwing gives to the Dragonators. At Airlandis, the compound covers the city, immobilizing its inhabitants until it is destroyed by electricity.
7	"The Defector"	Doug Booth; Savin Yeatman	October 26, 1996
During the Dragonators' patrol, they rescue Gangryn as he flees from Dreadwing's minions and bring him to Airlandis, where the Council offers him safe haven. However, Gangryn later betrays them and reveals to Dreadwing the presence of a portable "crystal reactor", prompting Orac and Z'Neth to arrange the theft of a powerless substitute.
8	"Warnado Rising"	David Toney; Savin Yeatman	November 2, 1996
Modified with lava-powered nuclear engines, Warnado rises from the surface to attack Airlandis. However, Summit infiltrates and destabilizes its engines, forcing Warnado to the ground.
9	"Bugz"	James Adner; David Toney; Savin Yeatman	November 9, 1996
Blackheart falls ill after being bitten by a mysterious insect, which Dreadwing takes advantage of by breeding the insects to attack Airlandis. Apex invades Warnado to force Gangryn to create an antidote.
10	"Lost Eden"	Peter Stone; Savin Yeatman	November 16, 1996
After being shot down by Dreadwing in a dogfight, Z'neth falls into a lava chasm to avoid his attackers. After Apex finds him, they venture into a nearby tunnel for cover, where they discover an Oasis. The Oasis is later destroyed by Blackheart when Z'neth challenges Dreadwing for control of it.
11	"The Mount Alayas"	Savin Yeatman; Lisa Morton	November 23, 1996
Airlandis discovers a series of mesas called Mount Alayas and attempts to colonize them, but Dreadwing attacks. It is also discovered that the native plants are hallucinogenic, making the area uninhabitable.
12	"Scavenger"	James Adner; Peter Stone; Savin Yeatman	November 30, 1996
The Dragon Flyz are joined by recruit Amod, but his distrust of dragons hinders their mission. Tensions rise when Orac's prototype Amber-retrieval aircraft, "The Scavenger", is taken for a test flight, offending Airlandis' dragons, but are resolved when the Scavenger is destroyed in battle.
13	"Dark Dramen"	Savin Yeatman; Peter Stone	December 7, 1996
After Dram spots plumes of smoke in the distance, they lead him to a village that has burned to the ground. Remembering his own past, Dram sets out to find his fellow Dramen, but the Dragonators follow him, and the local Dramen aid the Dragonators in their defense.
14	"The Eclipse"	James Adner; David Toney; Savin Yeatman	December 14, 1996
A solar eclipse triggers the appearance of an Amber sphere, which Apex investigates. She discovers that the Amber is guarded by robots who obey her, but not her brothers.
15	"There Can Be Only One"	Peter Stone; Savin Yeatman	December 21, 1996
Dreadwing banishes Nocturna from Warnado for her repeated failures to stop the Dragonators' Amber runs. Nocturna goes to Airlandis and offers to form an alliance with them, but later returns to Dreadwing.
16	"Cifex"	David Toney; Savin Yeatman	December 28, 1996
The Dragonators discover a bunker on the surface, in which they find a human survivor who identifies himself as Cifex. They take him back to Airlandis, where Apex becomes his guide. However, Dreadwing captures them and reveals that Cifex is an android. In the ensuing battle, Cifex is separated from Apex and presumed dead, but survives in secret.
17	"Into Hell's Gate"	Peter Stone; Savin Yeatman	January 4, 1997
The volcano Hell's Gate is erupting. As its previous eruption damaged Airlandis' Amber reactor, the Dragonators enter the volcano to prevent it from causing further damage.
18	"Ground Zero"	Peter Stone; Savin Yeatman	January 11, 1997
After being separated from the others during a surface flight, Peak discovers a cache of pre-Cataclysm long-range ballistic missiles. Dreadwing later retrieves them and plans to attack with them. However, after he carelessly launches the missiles simultaneously, the Dragonators redirect them to the launch site, which they destroy.
19	"Betrayed"	Peter Stone; Savin Yeatman	January 18, 1997
Gangryn has developed a machine which simulates powerful telepathic abilities. Dreadwing claims it as his own, which he subsequently uses to unleash havoc upon the Dragonators' operations.
20	"The Portal"	Savin Yeatman; Jeffrey Paul Kearney; Lisa Morton	January 25, 1997
When the Dragon Flyz spot a star-shaped ridge on the surface, but are denied permission to investigate, Aaron reveals that their mother, Miranda, was teleported by a machine to a space station. He and the Flyz reactivate the machine, and Peak confirms Miranda's survival aboard the station. However, Peak is forced to return alone, and the machine is destroyed by Dreadwing's followers.
21	"Dread Rules, Part 1"	Savin Yeatman; Jeffrey Paul Kearney; Lisa Morton	February 1, 1997
Confrontations between Councillor Joshua and Summit escalate after a failed Amber run, and he is eventually imprisoned on Joshua's orders.
22	"Dread Rules, Part 2"	Savin Yeatman; Jeffrey Paul Kearney; Lisa Morton	February 8, 1997
With Summit imprisoned and the Dragonators buried under an avalanche, Dreadwing has gained control of Airlandis. However, Aaron and Orac begin to fight back and sabotage Dreadwing's control.
23	"The Children's Crusade"	Peter Stone; Savin Yeatman	February 15, 1997
Apex falls into a coma after being hit by a mutagen-based weapon developed by Dreadwing's army. Two children, Lucy and Tommy, and their dragon Clawfire, who is Blazewind's child, set out to find a cure.
24	"The Chameleon"	Peter Stone; Savin Yeatman	February 22, 1997
After discovering fertile ground on the surface, Airlandis dispatches settlement units and Amber generators to establish a colony. Soon after, however, an unseen entity abducts the settlers' children, who turn out to be a population of three-headed "Tri-Dragons". Because the Amber reactors disrupt the Tri-Dragons' reproductive process, the colony is abandoned.
25	"The Accused"	David Toney; Savin Yeatman	March 1, 1997
Dreadwing captures Councillor Joshua and Z'neth and puts them on trial to justify humanity's actions against the mutants, with Dreadwing as judge, but they are rescued by Z'neth's siblings. The episode serves as a recap of the events of previous episodes.
26	"The F.I.S.T. Fighters"	Peter Stone; Savin Yeatman	March 8, 1997
After being shot down by the Dramen, Nora and Peak land in a cave and discover a giant pillar of Amber. However, they are confronted by a group of underground-dwelling humanoids who call themselves the Fight, Infiltrate, Strike, and Terminate Fighters.

== Toy line ==
There were two sets of Dragon Flyz toys released by Galoob. One set consists of the main characters in various costumes, equipped with rotating wings that enable them to fly, a launching device shaped as a dragon, and a DVD. The second set does not have the DVD, and the launcher does not look like a dragon. Variations include lone riders; lone dragons that fly by flapping their own wings; and figures that illuminate when launched. Most of the rider figures carry firearm-like weapons. Galoob released a similar toyline aimed at girls, Sky Dancers.

== Home media ==
Dragon Flyz had five VHS releases released by Columbia TriStar Home Video, four numbered volumes with a single episode each and "Dragon Flyz: The Legend Begins", a compilation of the first three episodes. There have been two region 2 DVDs, each with three episodes, in addition to those sold alongside the toys. The series has been officially released for viewing on YouTube by Mondo World.

== Film adaptation ==
In November 1995, Abrams/Gentile Entertainment was reportedly in discussions with New Line Cinema for a live-action Dragon Flyz film.
