= Celebrity doll =

Toy modeled after a famous person

A celebrity doll is a doll modeled after a celebrity.

Celebrity dolls have been in production for a very long time. In the 1840s, several famous ballerinas were featured as paper dolls. Also in the 19th century, various military heroes were portrayed as dolls or figures. With the advent of silent films, dolls of film stars were created. The John Bunny doll (a silent film star) was one of the first produced in 1914 by Louis Amberg & Sons. The first Charlie Chaplin doll was produced in 1915. The composition Baby Peggy doll was a huge success in 1923, also produced by the Amberg company. The Shirley Temple doll by Ideal was a phenomenon in the 1930s, and would go on to be one of the most successful celebrity dolls. First produced in 1934, millions of the composition Shirley dolls were produced (and, variations of the Shirley doll are being produced to this day, generally in porcelain or vinyl). After Shirley, companies like Alexander Doll Company and Ideal produced many different celebrity dolls, including Sonja Henie, Jane Withers and Deanna Durbin. Celebrity dolls still remain popular today, especially given the cult of celebrity that has developed in the 1980s-first decade of the 21st century. Because of the wide collecting audience for these dolls and their appeal as a cross-over collectible in many instances, some collectors also believe that the dolls have the possibility of appreciating in value in the future.

The best-selling celebrity dolls in history are the Spice Girls dolls, made in 1997, selling over 11 million. Other million selling dolls of the late 1990s and early 2000s include the Britney Spears doll, made in 1999, the New Kids on the Block dolls (selling over 2 million) and the Christina Aguilera doll (selling over 3 million). Mary-Kate and Ashley Olsen dolls were also popular from 1999 to 2004. Dolls of Lindsay Lohan, Hilary Duff and Destiny's Child were being made from 2005 to 2006. From 2007 to 2009, dolls based on characters in Disney Channel movies and TV series, such as High School Musical, Hannah Montana, The Cheetah Girls, Camp Rock and Wizards of Waverly Place were released. In the 2010s, dolls of Katy Perry, Nicki Minaj and Lady Gaga were made for charitable efforts.

== Various celebrity dolls ==
- A*Teens (Play Along, 2000)
- Aaliyah (Mattel, 2025)
- Aaron Carter (Play Along, 2000)
- Addison Rae (Bonkers Toys, 2022)
- Alice Cooper (Mego, 2023)
- Alice in Wonderland, Tim Burton (Tonner, 2010)
- Aly & AJ (Huckleberry Toys, 2007)
- Amelia Earhart (Mattel, 2018)
- Anne Francis (as Honey West) (Gilbert, 1965)
- Ashley Tisdale (Huckleberry Toys, 2008)
- Audrey Hepburn (Mattel, 1998 and 2013)
- Ashley Graham (Mattel, 2016)
- Ava DuVernay (Mattel, 2018)
- B*Witched (Yaboom Toys, 1999)
- Baby Peggy (Louis Amberg & Sons)
- Barbara Eden (Mattel)
- Barbra Streisand (Mattel, 2009)
- Bratz: The Movie (MGA Entertainment, 2007)
- Beverly Hills, 90210 cast (Mattel, 1991)
- Billie Eilish (Playmates Toys, 2020)
- Bindi Irwin (Mattel, 2018)
- Bob Hope (part of the Classic G.I. Joe line)
- Boy George (1984)
- Boyzone (Yaboom, 1999)
- Brandy (Mattel, 1999)
- Britney Spears (Yaboom Toys) (Play Along, 1999)
- Brooke Shields (LJN Toys, 1982)
- Bruce Lee (Mego, 2019)
- Bryce Dallas Howard (Mattel, 2018)
- BTS (Mattel, 2019)
- Camp Rock cast (Play Along, 2008)
- Captain & Tennille (Mego, 1977)
- Carol Burnett (Mattel, 2008)
- Cary Grant (World)
- Catherine, Duchess of Cambridge (Cache Sales, 2011, Mattel, 2011, and Ashton Drake)
- The Cheetah Girls (Play Along, 2007)
- Charisma Carpenter (Moore Action Collectibles)
- Charles Lindbergh (American Character, 1927)
- Charlie's Angels cast (Jakks Pacific, 2000)
- Chloe Kim (Mattel, 2018)
- Cher (Mego, 1976, 1977, 1978 and Mattel, 2000)
- Chris Pratt, (Mattel, 2018)
- Christie Brinkley (Matchbox, 1989)
- Christina Aguilera (Yaboom Toys, 1999)
- Clark Gable (Mattel)
- Claudia Schiffer (Hasbro)
- Cody Simpson (Wish Factory, 2011)
- Cyndi Lauper (Mattel, 2010)
- Daryl Dragon (Mego, 1977)
- David Duchovny (Mattel)
- Debbie Harry (Mattel, 2009)
- Descendants cast (Hasbro, 2015)
- Destiny's Child (Hasbro, 2001 and Mattel, 2005)
- Diana Serra Cary (Louis Amberg & Sons, 1923)
- Diana, Princess of Wales (The Great American Doll Company, 2000)
- Diana Ross (Mattel)
- Dolly Parton (Mego, 1970s)
- Donny Osmond (Mattel, 1976)
- Doris Day (Mattel, 2011)
- Dorothy Hamill (Ideal Toy Company, 1977)
- Dream (Play Along, 2001)
- Elizabeth Montgomery (Mattel)
- Elizabeth Taylor (Mattel)
- Elton John (Yaboom Toys, 1999)
- Elvis Presley (Mattel, 1998, 2008 and 2009)
- Emblem3 (The Bridge Direct, 2013)
- Evel Knievel (Ideal Toy Company, 1972)
- Faith Hill (Mattel, 2011)
- Farrah Fawcett (Mego, 1970s and Mattel, 2011)
- Fay Wray (Mattel)
- Fifth Harmony (Mattel, 2015)
- Frank Sinatra (Mattel, 1998)
- Fred Astaire (World Doll)
- Frida Kahlo (Mattel, 2018)
- Full House cast (Tiger, 1992)
- Gabby Douglas (Mattel, 2017)
- Gabriela Sabatini (The Great American Doll Company, 1995)
- Gareth Gates (Mattel, 2002/2003/2004/2019, Hasbro. 2010)
- Gigi Hadid (Mattel, 2017)
- Gillian Anderson (Mattel)
- Girls Aloud (Mattel, 2005)
- Goldie Hawn (Mattel, 2009)
- Gone with the Wind (Mattel)
- Guan Xiaotong (Mattel, 2018)
- Princess Grace (Franklin Mint and Mattel)
- Grease cast (Mattel)
- Gwen Stefani (Huckleberry Toys, 2007)
- H_{2}O: Just Add Water cast (Playmates Toys, 2009)
- Hairspray cast (Play Along, 2007)
- Halle Berry (Mattel, 2005, 2009)
- Hannah Montana cast (Play Along, 2007)
- Harry Potter cast
- Haylie Duff (Mattel, 2005)
- Heidi Klum (Mattel, 2009)
- Hélène Darroze (Mattel, 2018)
- Hilary Duff (Playmates Toys, 2004 and Mattel, 2005)
- HiHi Puffy AmiYumi (Mattel, 2004)
- High School Musical cast (Mattel, 2007)
- Honor Blackman (Mattel, 2009)
- Ibtihaj Muhammad (Mattel, 2017)
- Iris Apfel (Mattel, 2018)
- iCarly cast (Playmates Toys, 2009)
- Jackie Evancho (The Bridge Direct, 2011)
- James Bond (Mattel, 2002)
- James Dean (Mattel)
- Jane Seymour (Mattel, 2010)
- Jennifer Beals (Mattel)
- Jennifer Lopez (Mattel, 2013)
- Jimi Hendrix (Mego, 2018)
- Jimmy Osmond (Mattel, 1978)
- Joan Collins (Mattel, 2010)
- Joan Jett (Mattel, 2009)
- John Travolta (Chemtoy, 1977)
- Johnny Depp (Mattel, 2011)
- JoJo Siwa (Just Play, 2020)
- Josie and the Pussycats (Jakks Pacific, 2001)
- Julie Andrews (Mattel)
- Justin Bieber (The Bridge Direct, 2010)
- Karen Mulder (Hasbro)
- Kate Winslet (Mattel)
- Katherine Johnson (Mattel, 2018)
- Kathryn Grayson (American Character, late 1940s)
- Katy Perry (Mattel)
- Kimora Lee Simmons (Mattel, 2007)
- KISS
- Kylie Jenner, part of the Bratz line. (MGA Entertainment, 2023)
- Kylie Minogue (Jakks Pacific, 2004)
- Lady Gaga (as Zomby Gaga, part of the Monster High line - Mattel, 2016)
- Laurie Hernandez (Mattel, 2018)
- LeAnn Rimes (Mattel, 2005)
- Linda Evans (Mattel, 2010)
- Lindsay Lohan, part of the My Scene line. (Mattel, 2005)
- Little Mix (Vivid, 2012)
- Lucille Ball (American Character, 1952; Mattel)
- Mad Men cast (Mattel, 2010)
- Madonna
- Mandy Moore (Play Along, 2000)
- Marie Osmond (Mattel, 1976 and Charisma, 2010)
- Marilyn Manson
- Marilyn Monroe (Mattel)
- Marlene Dietrich (The Great American Doll Company)
- Martina McBride (Mattel, 2005)
- Martyna Wojciechowska (Mattel, 2018)
- Mary-Kate and Ashley Olsen (Mattel, 1999)
- Master P
- Maud Adams (Mattel, 2010)
- MC Hammer (Mattel, 1990)
- Melissa Joan Hart (Hasbro)
- Menudo (1983)
- Michael Jackson
- Mike Tyson (Storm Toys)
- Misty Copeland (Mattel, 2016)
- Muhammad Ali (Mego, 1976)
- Naomi Campbell (Hasbro)
- Natalia Vodianova (Mattel, 2017)
- New Kids on the Block (Hasbro, 1990)
- Nicki Minaj (Mattel, 2011)
- Nicola Adams (Mattel, 2018)
- NSYNC (Living Toyz, 2000)
- One Direction (Hasbro, 2012)
- Pamela Anderson (GIG and Triad Toys)
- Paris Hilton, part of the Rainbow High line. (MGA Entertainment, 2022)
- Patty Jenkins (Mattel, 2018)
- Patrick Dempsey (Disney, 2007)
- Penélope Cruz (Mattel, 2011)
- Prince William, Duke of Cambridge (Mattel, 2011)
- Priscilla Presley (Mattel, 2008)
- Project Mc^{2} cast (MGA Entertainment, 2015)
- RBD (Mattel, 2007)
- Reba McEntire (Mattel, 2011)
- Reese Witherspoon (Mattel)
- Roberto Durán (Jakks Pacific)
- Rock Hudson (Mattel, 2011)
- Rosie O'Donnell (Mattel, 1998)
- RuPaul (Integrity Toys, 2018)
- S Club 7 (Hasbro, 2000)
- Sara Gama (Mattel, 2018)
- Saved by the Bell cast (Tiger, 1992)
- Selena
- Shakira (Mattel, 2002)
- Shirley Temple (Ideal Toy Company, 1934)
- Sisqo (Play Along, 2000)
- Snoop Dogg
- Sonny Bono and Cher (Mego, 1976)
- Sophia Grace & Rosie (Just Play, 2014)
- Spice Girls (Galoob, 1997, Hasbro, 1998 and Toy Maxx (Yaboom), 1999)
- Stan Lee (Mego, 2020)
- Steps (Hasbro)
- Sugababes (Mattel)
- Susan Lucci (as Erica Kane from All My Children) (Mattel, 1998)
- Sweet Valley High (Bandai, 1993)
- Sylvester Stallone (as part of the Rocky dolls line, Jakks Pacific)
- Take That
- That Girl Lay Lay (Just Play, 2022)
- Tim McGraw (Mattel, 2011)
- Tippi Hedren (Mattel)
- Toni Tennille (Mego, 1977)
- Tyra Banks (Life-Size) Eve Doll
- Taylor Swift (Jakks Pacific, 2008)
- The Hunger Games (Mattel, 2012)
- The Lord of the Rings (Mattel, 2004; Toy Biz 2001/2002/2003)
- The Munsters (KB Toy Works; Hamilton Presents, 1991; Mattel, 2001; Premiere Lmt. Edition Collector's Series, 90's)
- The X-Files (Mattel, 1998)
- TLC (Yaboom Toys, 1999)
- Twiggy (Mattel, 1967)
- Twilight cast (Mattel, 2009)
- Ursula Andress (Mattel, 2009)
- Vanilla Ice (THQ, 1991)
- Vanna White (HSC, 1990)
- Venus Williams and Serena Williams (Play Along, 1999)
- Vitamin C (Mattel, 2000)
- Vivian Vance (Lucy and Ethel gift set, Mattel)
- Vivien Leigh (Mattel)
- Victorious cast (Spin Master, 2011)
- Xuxa (Mimo, 1987–1991, Rose Art, 1993, Estrela, 1997, Multibrink, 2000)
- Wizards of Waverly Place (Selena Gomez) (Mattel, 2009)
- Yvonne de Carlo (Mattel)
- Yuanyuan Tan (Mattel, 2018)
- Zendaya (Mattel, 2015)
- Zombies 2 cast (Mattel, 2020)
- Zombies 3 cast (Hasbro, 2022)

== See also ==
- Victorious Dolls
- Starting Lineup
