= Spice Girls dolls =

Series of celebrity dolls

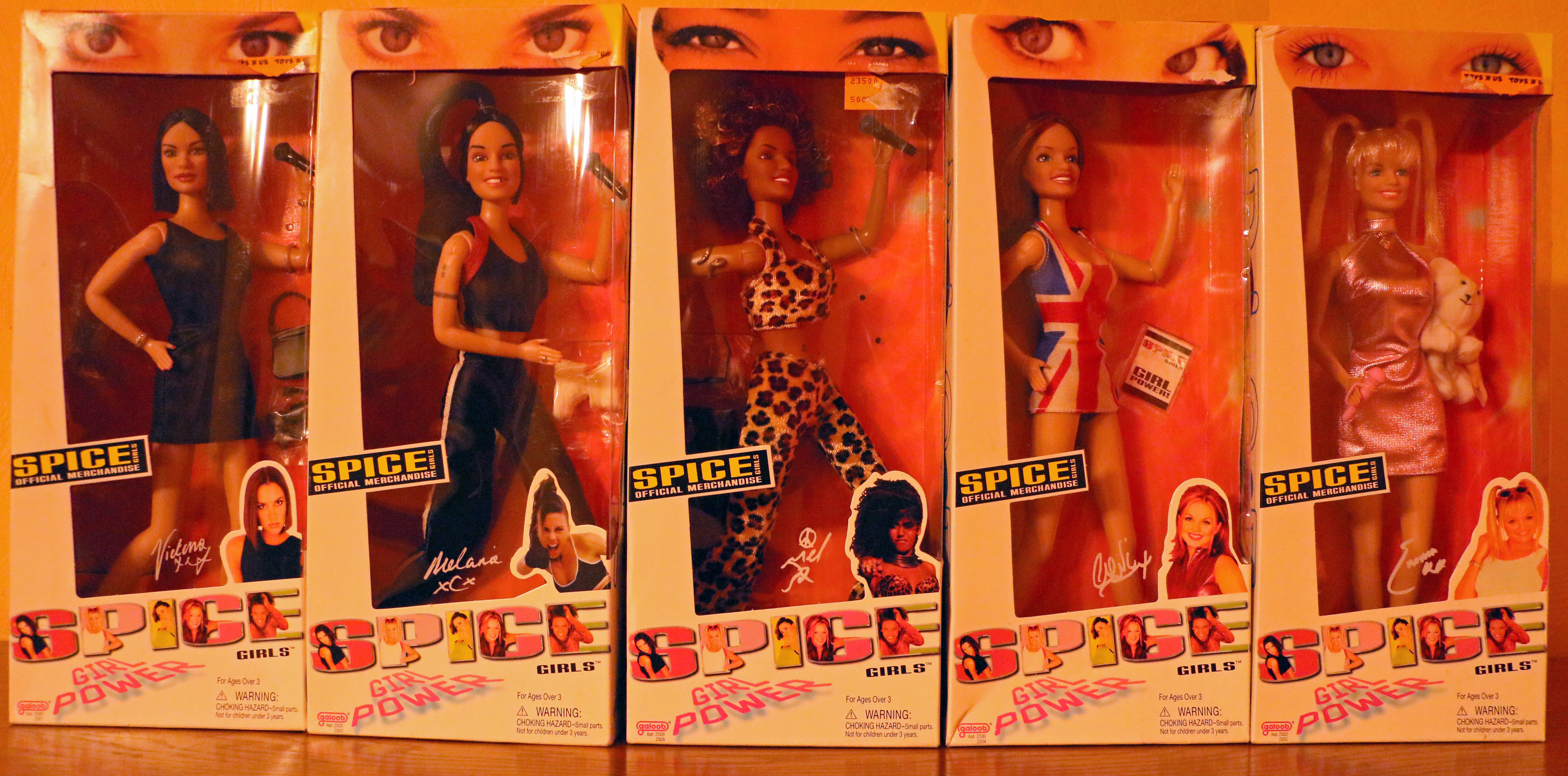
- Company: Galoob Toys
- Country: United States
- Availability: 1997–1999

The Spice Girls dolls are celebrity dolls based on the popular girl group the Spice Girls. They were released by Galoob Toys from 1997 to 1999. With sales of over 11 million, they are the best-selling celebrity dolls of all time.

== History ==
In October 1997, it was announced that the Spice Girls were collaborating with Galoob Toys to create a range of Spice Girls dolls. The first dolls were originally due to be released in 1998, but as the profile of the band rose, the decision was taken to expedite their production, just in time for the Christmas season.

The first set of dolls released by Galoob was called the "Girl Power" series, available in December 1997, after more than two months of negotiations with the band and their management about the products. Due to the hasty production, there was a low supply of the dolls, with only a fraction of the expected demand able to be met. Leading industry experts feared there would be a "toy rage" phenomenon, similar to Black Friday shopping. The set of dolls, all sold individually, initially featured Geri Halliwell ("Ginger Spice", who left the band in May 1998) in her iconic Union Jack dress, with red/blonde highlighted hair and Union Jack-themed platform shoes (modeled after her actual shoes by Buffalo). The dolls were retailed for around US$20-30.00 each.

In total, eight different sets of dolls were released by Galoob from 1997 to 1999. Each series released came with new, different outfits and additional accessories. Individually-sold extra products included the concert "Sound Stage" playset, a miniature "SpiceBus" (the band's tourbus, seen in their film), and different "Spiceworld Fashions" costumes. The "On Stage" series, released in June 1999, was the first series not to feature Halliwell, who had left the group in May 1998. The "On Tour" series featured accessories such as microphones, headsets, disco balls and miniature sound equipment. Dolls featuring the group wearing outfits from their music videos were planned, but never released. There were plans to continue the Spice Girls doll line into 2000, with the "Millennium Tour Collection", set for release in October; however, the line was postponed indefinitely when the future of the Spice Girls became uncertain.

The dolls became a huge hit during the Christmas seasons of 1997 and 1998, selling over 11 million. In 1997, the Spice Girls dolls generated more than $200 million in retail sales and the success of the dolls earned toymaker Galoob $150 million in pretax cash. The dolls were the fifth best-selling toy—despite limited stock—in the UK for the 1997 Christmas season according to the British Association of Toy Retailers' annual Christmas best-seller chart. In 1998, they were the second best-selling toy of 1998 in the USA according to toy trade publication Playthings' annual industry survey.

== Galoob collections ==
Galoob Five doll collections:

- "Girl Power" – December 1997 – ©1997 Galoob Toys, Inc.
- "On Tour" – June 1998 – ©1998 Galoob Toys, Inc. (two versions of Posh were made, the original with shoulder-length bob, and the second with new short crop)
- "Superstar Collection" – August 1998 – ©1998 Galoob Toys, Inc. (five dolls in one box)
- "Concert Collection" – Autumn 1998 – ©1998 Galoob Toys, Inc.
- "Spice It Up! 1" – January 1999 – ©1999 Galoob Toys, Inc.

Galoob/Hasbro Four doll collections:

- "On Stage" – June 1999 – ©1999 Galoob Toys, Inc.
- "Spice It Up! 2" – Summer 1999 – ©1999 Galoob Toys, Inc., a subdivision of Hasbro (with Spiceworld Fashions, ©1998 Galoob Toys, Inc.)
- "Viva Forever 1" – Autumn 1999 – ©1999 Hasbro, Inc. (including the Viva Forever videotape – shown at the 1999 Toy Fair as the "Collector Series" ©1999 Galoob Toys, Inc.)
- "Viva Forever 2" – Autumn 1999 – ©1999 Hasbro, Inc. (including the Viva Forever fairy finger puppets)
- "Millennium Tour Collection" – October 2000 – ©2000 Hasbro, Inc. (unproduced)

== Toymax (Yaboom) / Street Life collections ==
Toymax Inc. / Toymax (Yaboom) Inc. / Street Life Limited made dolls that could sing and talk.

- "My First Singing Spice Girl" Dolls – ©1998 – Street Life Limited
- "My Outfit, My Song" Fashions – ©1998 – Street Life Limited
- "My New Talking Spice Girl" Dolls – ©1999 Toymax Inc. / Street Life Limited

== See also ==
- Spice Girls merchandise and sponsorship deals
