= List of celebrity-branded perfumes =

Many celebrities have signed contracts with perfume houses to associate their name with a signature scent, as a self-promotion campaign. The scents are then marketed; the association with the celebrity's name usually being the selling point of the campaign.

== # ==
Key
| • | Denotes posthumous release |

List of scents / brands showing name, celebrity, occupation, label, production period, notes and references
| Scent / brand | Celebrity | Occupation(s) | Label | Prod. period | Notes | Ref. |
|---|---|---|---|---|---|---|
| Power by 50 Cent | 50 Cent | Rapper; actor; entrepreneur | Lighthouse Beauty | 2009–present | | |

== A ==
Key
| • | Denotes posthumous release |

List of scents / brands showing name, celebrity, occupation, label, production period, notes and references
| Scent / brand | Celebrity | Occupation(s) | Label | Prod. period | Notes | Ref. |
|---|---|---|---|---|---|---|
| Aaliyah • | Aaliyah | Singer; actress | Xyrena | 2015–present | | |
| Elevator Music | Virgil Abloh | Fashion designer | Byredo x Off-White | 2018–2021 | | |
| Solutions line •: Solution N°1; Solution N°2; Solution N°3; Solution N°4 | Virgil Abloh | Fashion designer | Off-White | 2022–present | Collection featuring four scents. | |
| Gossip by Cindy Adams | Cindy Adams | Gossip columnist | Gossip | 1997–present | | |
| Fetish by Christina Aguilera | Christina Aguilera | Singer; songwriter; actress; television personality | New Dana Perfumes Corporation (NACDS) | 2000–2002 | Collection featuring three unnamed scents. | |
| Xpose line: Xpose Desire; Xpose Glamour; Xpose Passion; Xpose Stardust | Christina Aguilera | Singer; songwriter; actress; television personality | Sarantis | 2004–? (Note: Year of discontinuation unknown) | Collection featuring four scents. Released in select countries in Europe. | |
| Christina Aguilera Fragrances | Christina Aguilera | Singer; songwriter; actress; television personality | Elizabeth Arden, Inc. (Note: Christina Aguilera Fragrances was originally manufactured by Procter & Gamble (P&G), until it was acquired by Elizabeth Arden, Inc. in 2016.) | 2007–present | Company with 17 scents. | |
| Ditch by Jonas Åkerlund | Jonas Åkerlund | Film director | The Perfumer's Story by Azzi | 2015–present | | |
| Konvict fragrance duo: Konvict Homme; Konvict Femme | Akon | Rapper; producer; entrepreneur | Akon Fragrances | 2010–present | | |
| Muhammad Ali | Muhammad Ali | Boxer | Crystal Fragrance | 1988–present | | |
| Legend collection •: Legend: Round 1; Legend: Round 2; Legend: Round 3 | Muhammad Ali | Boxer | DBI Innovations, UK LTD. | 2017–present | | |
| Legacy collection •: Legacy: Round 4; Legacy: Round 5; Legacy: Round 6; Legacy: Round 7 | Muhammad Ali | Boxer | DBI Innovations, UK LTD. | 2017–present | | |
| Malibu fragrance duo: Malibu Day; Malibu Night | Pamela Anderson | Model; actress | | 2009–present | | |
| Grace | Anggun | Singer | BEL Perfumes | 2014–present | | |
| Jennifer Aniston (Note: Originally named Lolavie) | Jennifer Aniston | Actress | Jennifer Aniston Fragrances | 2010–present | | |
| J by Jennifer Aniston | Jennifer Aniston | Actress | Jennifer Aniston Fragrances | 2014–present | | |
| Near Dusk | Jennifer Aniston | Actress | Jennifer Aniston Fragrances | 2015–present | | |
| Beachscape | Jennifer Aniston | Actress | Jennifer Aniston Fragrances | 2016–present | | |
| Luxe | Jennifer Aniston | Actress | Jennifer Aniston Fragrances | 2017–present | | |
| Chapter One | Jennifer Aniston | Actress | Jennifer Aniston Fragrances | 2017–present | | |
| Chapter Two | Jennifer Aniston | Actress | Jennifer Aniston Fragrances | 2018–present | | |
| Silver | Jennifer Aniston | Actress | Jennifer Aniston Fragrances | 2020–present | | |
| Solstice Bloom | Jennifer Aniston | Actress | Jennifer Aniston Fragrances | 2020–present | | |
| Agátta | Anitta | Singer | Puzzy by Anitta | 2022–present | | |
| Preparada | Anitta | Singer | Puzzy by Anitta | 2022–present | | |
| Se Envolve | Anitta | Singer | Puzzy by Anitta | 2022–present | | |
| Austin 3:16 Venom | Stone Cold Steve Austin | Wrestler | World Wrestling Federation x StarScents | 1999–early 2000's | | |
| Devil's Advocate | Iggy Azalea | Model; rapper | Merveilleux Beauty | 2021–present | | |

== B ==
Key
| • | Denotes posthumous release |

List of scents / brands showing name, celebrity, occupation, label, production period, notes and references
| Scent / brand | Celebrity | Occupation(s) | Label | Prod. period | Notes | Ref. |
|---|---|---|---|---|---|---|
| Dangerous line: Dangerous for Him; Dangerous for Her | Boosie Badazz | Rapper | Dangerous | 2019–present | | |
| Bossman | Boosie Badazz | Rapper | Dangerous | 2019–present | | |
| Bad Girl | Boosie Badazz | Rapper | Dangerous | 2019–present | | |
| Diavolo | Antonio Banderas | Actor | Puig | 1997–present | | |
| Mediterraneo | Antonio Banderas | Actor | Puig | 2001–present | | |
| Spirit | Antonio Banderas | Actor | Puig | 2004–present | | |
| Antonio | Antonio Banderas | Actor | Puig | 2007–present | | |
| Blue Seduction | Antonio Banderas | Actor | Puig | 2007–present | | |
| Seduction in Black | Antonio Banderas | Actor | Puig | 2009–present | | |
| The Secret | Antonio Banderas | Actor | Puig | 2010–present | | |
| The Icon | Antonio Banderas | Actor | Puig | 2021–present | | |
| Fuck Him All Night | Azealia Banks | Rapper; actress | CheapyXO | 2022–present | | |
| Foolish and Vacuous | Clive Barker | Writer; director | Black Phoenix Alchemy Lab | | | |
| Sweets to the Sweet | Clive Barker | Writer; director | Black Phoenix Alchemy Lab | | | |
| The Day Burned White | Clive Barker | Writer; director | Black Phoenix Alchemy Lab | | | |
| Baryshnikov | Mikhail Baryshnikov | Classical ballet dancer; dance director | Richard Barrie Fragrances | 1991–throughout 90's | | |
| 160° Lat | Tyson Beckford | Model; actor | Orion Skye | 2020–present | | |
| David Beckham Instinct | David Beckham | Footballer | Coty | 2005–present | | |
| Intimately Beckham | David Beckham | Footballer | Coty | 2006–present | | |
| Homme by David Beckham | David Beckham | Footballer | Coty | 2011–present | | |
| Portofino '97 | Victoria Beckham | Singer; Actress; Fashion designer | Victoria Beckham Beauty | 2023–present | | |
| Suite 302 | Victoria Beckham | Singer; Actress; Fashion designer | Victoria Beckham Beauty | 2023–present | | |
| San Ysidro Drive | Victoria Beckham | Singer; Actress; Fashion designer | Victoria Beckham Beauty | 2023–present | | |
| The Eighth | Ashley Benson | Actress | Ash by Ashley Benson | 2022–present | | |
| East 12th | Ashley Benson | Actress | Ash by Ashley Benson | 2022–present | | |
| Halle Berry | Halle Berry | Actress | Coty | 2008–present | | |
| Halle Pure Orchid | Halle Berry | Actress | Coty | 2010–present | | |
| Reveal | Halle Berry | Actress | Coty | 2010–present | | |
| Reveal the Passion | Halle Berry | Actress | Coty | 2011–present | | |
| Closer | Halle Berry | Actress | Coty | 2012–present | | |
| Exotic Jasmine | Halle Berry | Actress | Coty | 2013–present | | |
| Wild Essence | Halle Berry | Actress | Coty | 2014–present | | |
| True Star | Beyoncé | Singer; songwriter; actress; director | Tommy Hilfiger | 2004–present | | |
| True Star Gold | Beyoncé | Singer; songwriter; actress; director | Tommy Hilfiger | 2005–present | | |
| Heat | Beyoncé | Singer; songwriter; actress; director | Coty | 2010–present | | |
| Heat Ultimate Elixir | Beyoncé | Singer; songwriter; actress; director | Coty | 2010–present | | |
| Heat Rush | Beyoncé | Singer; songwriter; actress; director | Coty | 2011–present | | |
| Pulse | Beyoncé | Singer; songwriter; actress; director | International Flavors & Fragrances | 2011–present | | |
| Pulse Summer Edition | Beyoncé | Singer; songwriter; actress; director | International Flavors & Fragrances | 2012–present | | |
| Midnight Heat | Beyoncé | Singer; songwriter; actress; director | Coty | 2012–present | | |
| Pulse NYC | Beyoncé | Singer; songwriter; actress; director | International Flavors & Fragrances | 2013–present | | |
| Heat: The Mrs. Carter World Tour Edition | Beyoncé | Singer; songwriter; actress; director | Coty | 2013–present | | |
| Rise | Beyoncé | Singer; songwriter; actress; director | Coty | 2014–present | | |
| Heat Wild Orchid | Beyoncé | Singer; songwriter; actress; director | Coty | 2014–present | | |
| Rise Sheer | Beyoncé | Singer; songwriter; actress; director | Coty | 2015–present | | |
| Heat Kissed | Beyoncé | Singer; songwriter; actress; director | Coty | 2015–present | | |
| Heat Seduction | Beyoncé | Singer; songwriter; actress; director | Coty | 2016–present | | |
| Shimmering Heat | Beyoncé | Singer; songwriter; actress; director | Coty | 2017–present | | |
| Cé Noir | Beyoncé | Singer; songwriter; actress; director | | 2023–present | Released with limited-edition art promoting Knowles' album Renaissance | |
| Cé Lumière | Beyoncé | Singer; songwriter; actress; director | | 2024–present | | |
| Someday | Justin Bieber | Singer | Elizabeth Arden, Inc. | 2011–present | | |
| Girlfriend | Justin Bieber | Singer | | 2012–present | | |
| Someday: Limited Edition | Justin Bieber | Singer | | 2012–present | | |
| The Key | Justin Bieber | Singer | | 2013–present | | |
| Someday: Summer Edition | Justin Bieber | Singer | | 2013–present | | |
| Next Girlfriend | Justin Bieber | Singer | | 2014–present | | |
| Collector's Edition | Justin Bieber | Singer | | 2014–present | | |
| Pure Escensia Woman | David Bisbal | Singer | | 2006–present | | |
| Pure Escensia Man | David Bisbal | Singer | | 2006–present | | |
| Man | David Bisbal | Singer | | | | |
| Woman | David Bisbal | Singer | | | | |
| DB Black | David Bisbal | Singer | | | | |
| DB Rose | David Bisbal | Singer | | | | |
| Mirar Atras | David Bisbal | Singer | | | | |
| Love | Michael Bolton | Singer | Great HealthWorks, Inc. | 2019–present | Also contains a body lotion, "Time", and a shower gel, "Tenderness" | |
| Breathe | Toni Braxton | Singer • Songwriter • Actress | Home Shopping Network (HSN) | 2021–present | Signature floral-fruity fragrance inspired by her hit ballad "Breathe Again", featuring a custom bottle modeled after her Las Vegas stage microphone. | |
| Wildly Me | Millie Bobby Brown | Actor | Florence by Mills | 2023–present | | |
| By Invitation | Michael Bublé | Singer | Fragrance Group London | 2016–present | | |
| By Invitation Peony Noir | Michael Bublé | Singer | Fragrance Group London | 2018–present | | |
| By Invitation Rose Gold | Michael Bublé | Singer | Fragrance Group London | 2018–present | | |
| By Invitation Signature | Michael Bublé | Singer | Fragrance Group London | 2018–present | | |
| Michael Bublé Pour Homme | Michael Bublé | Singer | Fragrance Group London | 2018–present | | |
| Passion | Michael Bublé | Singer | Fragrance Group London | 2020–present | | |

== C ==
Key
| • | Denotes posthumous release |

List of scents / brands showing name, celebrity, occupation, label, production period, notes and references
| Scent / brand | Celebrity | Occupation(s) | Label | Prod. period | Notes | Ref. |
|---|---|---|---|---|---|---|
| Naomi Campbell | Naomi Campbell | Model; writer; television personality | Procter & Gamble | 1999–present | | |
| Naomagic | Naomi Campbell | Model; writer; television personality | Procter & Gamble | 2000–present | | |
| Exult | Naomi Campbell | Model; writer; television personality | Procter & Gamble | 2001–present | | |
| Naomi Campbell: Shine & Glimmer | Naomi Campbell | Model; writer; television personality | Procter & Gamble | 2001–present | | |
| Mystery | Naomi Campbell | Model; writer; television personality | Procter & Gamble | 2003–present | | |
| Naomi Campbell: Light Edition | Naomi Campbell | Model; writer; television personality | Procter & Gamble | 2003–present | | |
| Sunset | Naomi Campbell | Model; writer; television personality | Procter & Gamble | 2004–present | | |
| Paradise Passion | Naomi Campbell | Model; writer; television personality | Procter & Gamble | 2005–present | | |
| Winter Kiss | Naomi Campbell | Model; writer; television personality | Procter & Gamble | 2006–present | | |
| Cat Deluxe | Naomi Campbell | Model; writer; television personality | Procter & Gamble | 2006–present | | |
| Cat Deluxe at Night | Naomi Campbell | Model; writer; television personality | Procter & Gamble | 2007–present | | |
| Eternal Beauty | Naomi Campbell | Model; writer; television personality | Procter & Gamble | 2007–present | | |
| Seductive Elixir | Naomi Campbell | Model; writer; television personality | Procter & Gamble | 2008–present | | |
| Cat Deluxe With Kisses | Naomi Campbell | Model; writer; television personality | Procter & Gamble | 2009–present | | |
| Naomi | Naomi Campbell | Model; writer; television personality | Procter & Gamble | 2010–present | | |
| Naomi Campbell: Wild Pearl | Naomi Campbell | Model; writer; television personality | Procter & Gamble | 2011–present | | |
| Naomi Campbell at Night | Naomi Campbell | Model; writer; television personality | Procter & Gamble | 2012–present | | |
| Queen of Gold | Naomi Campbell | Model; writer; television personality | Procter & Gamble | 2013–present | | |
| Private | Naomi Campbell | Model; writer; television personality | Procter & Gamble | 2015–present | | |
| Bohemian Garden | Naomi Campbell | Model; writer; television personality | Procter & Gamble | 2016–present | | |
| Prêt à Porter | Naomi Campbell | Model; writer; television personality | Procter & Gamble | 2016–present | | |
| Prêt à Porter Silk Collection | Naomi Campbell | Model; writer; television personality | Procter & Gamble | 2017–present | | |
| Prêt à Porter Absolute Velvet | Naomi Campbell | Model; writer; television personality | Procter & Gamble | 2018–present | | |
| Glam Rouge | Naomi Campbell | Model; writer; television personality | Procter & Gamble | 2018–present | | |
| Cat Deluxe Silver | Naomi Campbell | Model; writer; television personality | Procter & Gamble | 2019–present | | |
| Here to Stay | Naomi Campbell | Model; writer; television personality | Procter & Gamble | 2020–present | | |
| Here to Shine | Naomi Campbell | Model; writer; television personality | Procter & Gamble | 2021–present | | |
| Oh Boy | Cam'ron | Rapper; actor | | 2002–200? | | |
| M | Mariah Carey | Singer; songwriter; actress | Elizabeth Arden, Inc. | 2007–present | | |
| M by Mariah Carey: Deluxe Gold Edition | Mariah Carey | Singer; songwriter; actress | Elizabeth Arden, Inc. | 2008–present | | |
| Luscious Pink | Mariah Carey | Singer; songwriter; actress | Elizabeth Arden, Inc. | 2008–present | | |
| Luscious Pink: Deluxe Edition | Mariah Carey | Singer; songwriter; actress | Elizabeth Arden, Inc. | 2009–present | | |
| Forever | Mariah Carey | Singer; songwriter; actress | Elizabeth Arden, Inc. | 2009–present | | |
| M: Ultra Pink | Mariah Carey | Singer; songwriter; actress | Elizabeth Arden, Inc. | 2009–present | | |
| Lollipop Bling (Ribbon, Mine Again, Honey, That Chick) | Mariah Carey | Singer; songwriter; actress | Elizabeth Arden, Inc. | 2010–present | | |
| Lollipop Bling Splash Remixes (Never Forget You, Vision of Love, Inseparable) | Mariah Carey | Singer; songwriter; actress | Elizabeth Arden, Inc. | 2011–present | | |
| Dreams | Mariah Carey | Singer; songwriter; actress | Elizabeth Arden, Inc. | 2013–present | | |
| Wanderlove | Carmindy | Makeup Artist | ScentBeauty | 2020–present | | |
| Sweet Tooth | Sabrina Carpenter | Actress; singer | ScentBeauty | 2022–present | | |
| Caramel Dream | Sabrina Carpenter | Actress; singer | ScentBeauty | 2024–present | | |
| Cherry Baby | Sabrina Carpenter | Actress; singer | ScentBeauty | 2024–present | | |
| Me Espresso | Sabrina Carpenter | Actress; singer | ScentBeauty | 2024–present | | |
| Dirty Violet | Violet Chachki | Drag queen | Heretic Parfum | 2019–2023 | | |
| Sea Gypsy | Nadine Chandrawinata | Actress | BEL Perfumes | 2014–present | | |
| Hawaiian Huntress • | Beth Chapman | Bounty hunter; reality television personality | Cicely for Beth | 2020–2022 | | |
| Uninhibited | Cher | Singer; actress | Parfums Stern | 1987–present | | |
| Eau de Couture | Cher | Singer; actress | ScentBeauty | 2019–present | | |
| 60's Couture | Cher | Singer; actress | ScentBeauty | 2022–present | | |
| 70's Couture | Cher | Singer; actress | ScentBeauty | 2022–present | | |
| 80's Couture | Cher | Singer; actress | ScentBeauty | 2022–present | | |
| 90's Couture | Cher | Singer; actress | ScentBeauty | 2022–present | | |
| StormFlower | Cheryl | Singer | SAS&Company | 2014–present | | |
| Grace by Grace Coddington | Grace Coddington | Model; Vogue creative director | Comme des Garçons | 2016–present | | |
| Diva Pink | Gemma Collins | Media personality; businesswoman | | 2019–present | | |
| Spectacular | Joan Collins | Actress | | 1989–present | | |
| I Am Woman | Joan Collins | Actress | Joan Collins Beauty | 2014–present | | |
| Unforgivable | Sean Combs | Rapper; record executive; entrepreneur | Estée Lauder | 2006–present | | |
| Unforgivable Women | Sean Combs | Rapper; record executive; entrepreneur | Estée Lauder | 2007–present | | |
| Unforgivable Multi-Platinum Edition | Sean Combs | Rapper; record executive; entrepreneur | Estée Lauder | 2007–present | | |
| Unforgivable Women Black | Sean Combs | Rapper; record executive; entrepreneur | Estée Lauder | 2008–present | | |
| Unforgivable Black | Sean Combs | Rapper; record executive; entrepreneur | Estée Lauder | 2008–present | | |
| I Am King | Sean Combs | Rapper; record executive; entrepreneur | Estée Lauder | 2008–present | | |
| I Am King of the Night | Sean Combs | Rapper; record executive; entrepreneur | Estée Lauder | 2009–present | | |
| Unforgivable Night | Sean Combs | Rapper; record executive; entrepreneur | Estée Lauder | 2009–present | | |
| Unforgivable Eau Fraiche | Sean Combs | Rapper; record executive; entrepreneur | Estée Lauder | 2009–present | | |
| I Am King of Miami | Sean Combs | Rapper; record executive; entrepreneur | Estée Lauder | 2011–present | | |
| Empress | Sean Combs | Rapper; record executive; entrepreneur | Estée Lauder | 2011–present | | |
| 3 Am | Sean Combs | Rapper; record executive; entrepreneur | Parlux | 2015–present | | |
| Sean John | Sean Combs | Rapper; record executive; entrepreneur | Parlux | 2016–present | | |
| Loved | Lauren Conrad | Reality television personality; fashion designer | Scent Beauty | 2022–present | | |
| Cindy Crawford | Cindy Crawford | Model | Procter & Gamble | 2002–present | | |
| Cindy Crawford Feminine | Cindy Crawford | Model | Procter & Gamble | | | |
| Joyful | Cindy Crawford | Model | Procter & Gamble | | | |
| Waterfalls | Cindy Crawford | Model | Procter & Gamble | 2005–present | | |
| Summer Day | Cindy Crawford | Model | Procter & Gamble | 2006–present | | |
| Cumming | Alan Cumming | Actor | CB I Hate Perfume | 2005–201? | | |
| Second Cumming | Alan Cumming | Actor | CB I Hate Perfume | 2010–201? | | |

== D ==
Key
| • | Denotes posthumous release |

List of scents / brands showing name, celebrity, occupation, label, production period, notes and references
| Scent / brand | Celebrity | Occupation(s) | Label | Prod. period | Notes | Ref. |
|---|---|---|---|---|---|---|
| Salvador Dalí fragrance line | Salvador Dalí | Artist | Francis Kurkdjian, Les Parfums Salvador Dalí, and more | 1983–present | 75+ fragrances inspired by Dalí's work | |
| Alain Delon fragrance brand | Alain Delon | Actor | | 1979–2001 | 12 fragrances | |
| Born Dreamer | Charli D'Amelio | TikTok personality | Robertet | 2022–present | | |
| Deneuve | Catherine Deneuve | Actress | Avon | 1986–199? | | |
| Beautiful Mess | Gabi DeMartino | Singer; media personality | | 2020–present | | |
| Celine Dion | Celine Dion | Singer | Coty | 2003–present | | |
| Notes | Celine Dion | Singer | Coty | 2003–present | | |
| Belong | Celine Dion | Singer | Coty | 2005–present | | |
| Always Belong | Celine Dion | Singer | Coty | 2006–present | | |
| Enchanting | Celine Dion | Singer | Coty | 2006–present | | |
| Paris Nights | Celine Dion | Singer | Coty | 2007–present | | |
| Spring in Paris | Celine Dion | Singer | Coty | 2007–present | | |
| Sensational | Celine Dion | Singer | Coty | 2008–present | | |
| Sensational Moment | Celine Dion | Singer | Coty | 2008–present | | |
| Chic | Celine Dion | Singer | Coty | 2009–present | | |
| Spring in Provence | Celine Dion | Singer | Coty | 2009–present | | |
| Simply Chic | Celine Dion | Singer | Coty | 2010–present | | |
| Sensational Luxe Blossom | Celine Dion | Singer | Coty | 2013–present | | |
| All For Love | Celine Dion | Singer | Coty | 2014–present | | |
| Angel | DJ Python | Producer; DJ | UFO Parfums | 2022 | Limited edition. | |
| Rose Quartz | Alesha Dixon | Singer | | 2016–present | | |
| Amethyst | Alesha Dixon | Singer | | 2016–present | | |
| With Love... Hilary Duff | Hilary Duff | Actress; singer | Elizabeth Arden, Inc. | 2006–present | | |
| Wrapped With Love | Hilary Duff | Actress; singer | Elizabeth Arden, Inc. | 2008–present | | |
| Black Moonlight / NeoRio | Duran Duran | Band; Musicians | Xerjoff | 2025–present | Unisex fragrances created in collaboration with Italian luxury house Xerjoff (Blends Collection). | |
| Black Moonlight | Duran Duran | Band; Musicians | Xerjoff | 2025–present | | |

== E ==
Key
| • | Denotes posthumous release |

List of scents / brands showing name, celebrity, occupation, label, production period, notes and references
| Scent / brand | Celebrity | Occupation(s) | Label | Prod. period | Notes | Ref. |
|---|---|---|---|---|---|---|
| Eilish | Billie Eilish | Singer | Billie Eilish Fragrances | 2021–present | | |
| Eilish no. 2 | Billie Eilish | Singer | Billie Eilish Fragrances | 2022–present | | |
| Eilish no. 3 | Billie Eilish | Singer | Billie Eilish Fragrances | 2023–present | | |
| Your Turn | Billie Eilish | Singer | Billie Eilish Fragrances | 2025–present | | |
| Carmen Electra | Carmen Electra | Actress | LR | 2007–present | | |
| E | Princess Elizabeth of Yugoslavia | Monarch | HRH Princess Elizabeth | 2002–present | | |
| Jelisaveta | Princess Elizabeth of Yugoslavia | Monarch | HRH Princess Elizabeth | | | |
| Evil by Elvira | Elvira, Mistress of the Dark | Actress; television host | Florasynth | 1990–199? | | |
| Black Roses | Elvira, Mistress of the Dark | Actress; television host | Demeter Fragrance Library | 2013–2020 | | |
| Vamp | Elvira, Mistress of the Dark | Actress; television host | Demeter Fragrance Library | 2013–2020 | | |
| Zombie | Elvira, Mistress of the Dark | Actress; television host | Demeter Fragrance Library | 2013–2020 | | |

== F ==
Key
| • | Denotes posthumous release |

List of scents / brands showing name, celebrity, occupation, label, production period, notes and references
| Scent / brand | Celebrity | Occupation(s) | Label | Prod. period | Notes | Ref. |
|---|---|---|---|---|---|---|
| JWoww | Jenni "JWoww" Farley | Reality TV personality | Australian Gold | 2011–present | | |
| Outspoken by Fergie | Fergie | Singer | Avon | 2010–present | Liquid and solid perfume. | |
| Outspoken Party | Fergie | Singer | Avon | | | |
| Outspoken Intense | Fergie | Singer | Avon | | | |
| Outspoken Fresh | Fergie | Singer | Avon | | | |
| Libertad | Jonathan Fernandez | Reality TV personality | Caonabo & Co. (Whiff) | 2019–present | | |
| Magdalene | FKA twigs | Musician; actress | House of Matriarch | 2021 | Limited edition. | |
| La Voce | Renée Fleming | Opera Singer | Coty | 2008–2008 | | |
| La Voce | Renée Fleming | Opera Singer | Scent Beauty | 2019–present | | |

== G ==
Key
| • | Denotes posthumous release |

List of scents / brands showing name, celebrity, occupation, label, production period, notes and references
| Scent / brand | Celebrity | Occupation(s) | Label | Prod. period | Notes | Ref. |
|---|---|---|---|---|---|---|
| Lady Gaga Fame | Lady Gaga | Singer; songwriter; actress | Haus Laboratories x Coty | 2012–present | | |
| Eau de Gaga | Lady Gaga | Singer; songwriter; actress | Haus Laboratories x Coty | 2014–present | | |
| Neil Gaiman fragrance line | Neil Gaiman | Author | Black Phoenix Alchemy Lab | 2011–present | Numerous; ten collections based on Gaiman's writing, including Coraline, American Gods, Stardust, and Good Omens. | |
| Judy • | Judy Garland | Actress; singer | Vincenzo Spinnato | 2022–present | Marking Garland's centennial birthday. | |
| Electric Youth | Debbie Gibson | Singer; actress | Natural Wonder | 1989–present | | |
| Selena Gomez | Selena Gomez | Singer; actress; entrepreneur | ID Perfumes | 2011–present | | |
| Vivamore | Selena Gomez | Singer; actress; entrepreneur | ID Perfumes | 2012–present | | |
| Delta | Delta Goodrem | Singer; actress | Bondi Perfume, Co. | 2017–present | | |
| Dream | Delta Goodrem | Singer; actress | Bondi Perfume, Co. | 2018–present | | |
| Destiny | Delta Goodrem | Singer; actress | Bondi Perfume, Co. | 2019–present | | |
| Power | Delta Goodrem | Singer; actress | Bondi Perfume, Co. | 2022–present | | |
| Shh... | Jade Goody | Television personality | | 2006 | | |
| Whispers of Strength | Camille Grammer | Dancer; reality television personality | House of Sillage | 2017–present | Charitable collaboration. | |
| Ari | Ariana Grande | Singer; songwriter; actress | Luxe Brands | 2015–present | | |
| Frankie | Ariana Grande | Singer; songwriter; actress | Luxe Brands | 2016–present | | |
| Sweet Like Candy | Ariana Grande | Singer; songwriter; actress | Luxe Brands | 2016–present | | |
| Sweet Like Candy Limited Edition | Ariana Grande | Singer; songwriter; actress | Luxe Brands | 2017–2018 | Limited edition scent. | |
| Moonlight | Ariana Grande | Singer; songwriter; actress | Luxe Brands | 2017–present | | |
| Cloud | Ariana Grande | Singer; songwriter; actress | Luxe Brands | 2018–present | | |
| Thank U, Next | Ariana Grande | Singer; songwriter; actress | Luxe Brands | 2019–present | | |
| R.E.M. | Ariana Grande | Singer; songwriter; actress | Luxe Brands | 2020–present | | |
| God is a Woman | Ariana Grande | Singer; songwriter; actress | Luxe Brands | 2021–present | | |
| Cloud Intense | Ariana Grande | Singer; songwriter; actress | Luxe Brands | 2021–present | | |
| Thank U, Next 2.0 | Ariana Grande | Singer; songwriter; actress | Luxe Brands | 2021–present | | |
| Mod line: Mod Blush; Mod Vanilla | Ariana Grande | Singer; songwriter; actress | Luxe Brands | 2022–present | | |
| Cloud Pink Lovenotes | Ariana Grande | Singer; songwriter; actress | Luxe Brands | 2023–present 2024–present | | |
| Jack | Richard E. Grant | Actor | Jack Perfume by Richard E. Grant | 2014–present | | |
| Jack – Covent Garden | Richard E. Grant | Actor | Jack Perfume by Richard E. Grant | 2015–present | | |
| Jack – Piccadilly '69 | Richard E. Grant | Actor | Jack Perfume by Richard E. Grant | 2016–present | | |
| Jack Richmond | Richard E. Grant | Actor | Jack Perfume by Richard E. Grant | 2020–present | | |
| Kitten Fur Grumpy Cat | Grumpy Cat | Internet celebrity | Demeter Fragrances | 2019–present | Limited edition. Part of Demeter Fragrances' Kitten Fur line. | |
| Daphne | Daphne Guinness | Socialite; artist | Comme des Garçons Parfum | 2009–present | | |
| V by Vicki Gunvalson | Vicki Gunvalson | Reality television personality | Dosis Fragrance | 2015–present | | |

== H ==
Key
| • | Denotes posthumous release |

List of scents / brands showing name, celebrity, occupation, label, production period, notes and references
| Scent / brand | Celebrity | Occupation(s) | Label | Prod. period | Notes | Ref. |
|---|---|---|---|---|---|---|
| Black XS Be a Legend: Debbie Harry | Debbie Harry | Singer • Songwriter • Actress | Paco Rabanne | 2014 | Limited-edition rock-icon-inspired fragrance from the Black XS "Be a Legend" music collection, featuring notes of white rose, hellebore, saffron, patchouli, and black vanilla. | |
| Mwah... | Chanelle Hayes | Television personality | | 2007 | | |
| By Kilian | Kilian Hennessy | Socialite; LVMH heir | Estée Lauder | 2007–present | Company with 35+ fragrances. | |
| Ana Hickmann | Ana Hickmann | Model; television presenter | Gold in Shawdow | | | |
| Soul2Soul | Faith Hill | Singer | Coty | | | |
| True | Faith Hill | Singer | Coty | 2010–present | | |
| Faith Hill Parfums | Faith Hill | Singer | Coty | 2009–present | | |
| My Secret | Kathy Hilton | Socialite; reality TV personality | | 2008–present | | |
| Paris Hilton | Paris Hilton | Socialite; reality television personality; actress; singer; DJ | Parlux | 2005–present | | |
| Paris Hilton for Men | Paris Hilton | Socialite; reality television personality; actress; singer; DJ | Parlux | 2005–present | | |
| Paris Hilton Sheer | Paris Hilton | Socialite; reality television personality; actress; singer; DJ | Parlux | 2005–present | | |
| Just Me | Paris Hilton | Socialite; reality television personality; actress; singer; DJ | Parlux | 2005–present | | |
| Just Me For Men | Paris Hilton | Socialite; reality television personality; actress; singer; DJ | Parlux | 2005–present | | |
| Heiress | Paris Hilton | Socialite; reality television personality; actress; singer; DJ | Parlux | 2006–present | | |
| Heir | Paris Hilton | Socialite; reality television personality; actress; singer; DJ | Parlux | 2006–present | | |
| Can Can | Paris Hilton | Socialite; reality television personality; actress; singer; DJ | Parlux | 2007–present | | |
| Fairy Dust | Paris Hilton | Socialite; reality television personality; actress; singer; DJ | Parlux | 2008–present | | |
| Siren | Paris Hilton | Socialite; reality television personality; actress; singer; DJ | Parlux | 2009–present | | |
| Tease | Paris Hilton | Socialite; reality television personality; actress; singer; DJ | Parlux | 2010–present | | |
| Paris Hilton Passport | Paris Hilton | Socialite; reality television personality; actress; singer; DJ | Parlux | 2010–2011 | Collection featuring four fragrances: South Beach, Paris, Tokyo, and St. Moritz. | |
| Dazzle | Paris Hilton | Socialite; reality television personality; actress; singer; DJ | Parlux | 2012–present | | |
| Can Can Burlesque | Paris Hilton | Socialite; reality television personality; actress; singer; DJ | Parlux | 2014–present | | |
| With Love | Paris Hilton | Socialite; reality television personality; actress; singer; DJ | Parlux | 2014–present | | |
| Paris Hilton: Limited Edition Anniversary | Paris Hilton | Socialite; reality television personality; actress; singer; DJ | Parlux | 2015–present | | |
| Heiress: Limited Edition | Paris Hilton | Socialite; reality television personality; actress; singer; DJ | Parlux | 2016–present | | |
| Gold Rush | Paris Hilton | Socialite; reality television personality; actress; singer; DJ | Parlux | 2016–present | | |
| Gold Rush Man | Paris Hilton | Socialite; reality television personality; actress; singer; DJ | Parlux | 2017–present | | |
| Rosé Rush | Paris Hilton | Socialite; reality television personality; actress; singer; DJ | Parlux | 2017–present | | |
| Can Can: Bling Edition | Paris Hilton | Socialite; reality television personality; actress; singer; DJ | Parlux | 2017–present | | |
| Platinum Rush | Paris Hilton | Socialite; reality television personality; actress; singer; DJ | Parlux | 2018–present | | |
| Pink Rush | Paris Hilton | Socialite; reality television personality; actress; singer; DJ | Parlux | 2019–present | | |
| Luxe Rush | Paris Hilton | Socialite; reality television personality; actress; singer; DJ | Parlux | 2019–present | | |
| Electrify | Paris Hilton | Socialite; reality television personality; actress; singer; DJ | Parlux | 2019–present | | |
| Ruby Rush | Paris Hilton | Socialite; reality television personality; actress; singer; DJ | Parlux | 2022–present | | |
| Love Rush | Paris Hilton | Socialite; reality television personality; actress; singer; DJ | Parlux | 2022–present | | |
| Fly | Lisa Hochstein | Reality television personality | Aroma 360 | 2023–present | | |
| Whale by John Hodgman | John Hodgman | Humorist | Drom fragrances | 2013–present | | |
| AH | Anthony Hopkins | Actor | | 2020–present | | |
| Whitney Houston • | Whitney Houston | Singer; actress | Scent Beauty | 2022–present | | |
| La'Dame | Karen Huger | Reality television personality | | 2018–present | | |

== I ==
Key
| • | Denotes posthumous release |

List of scents / brands showing name, celebrity, occupation, label, production period, notes and references
| Scent / brand | Celebrity | Occupation(s) | Label | Prod. period | Notes | Ref. |
|---|---|---|---|---|---|---|
| Adrenaline | Enrique Iglesias | Singer; songwriter | Coty | 2014–present | | |
| Adrenaline Night | Enrique Iglesias | Singer; songwriter | Coty | 2015–present | | |
| Deeply Yours fragrance duo: Deeply Yours for Her; Deeply Yours for Him | Enrique Iglesias | Singer; songwriter | Coty | 2015–present | | |
| Only | Julio Iglesias | Singer; songwriter; footballer | Myrugia | 1989–present | | |
| Only for Men | Julio Iglesias | Singer; songwriter; footballer | Myrugia | 1991–present | | |
| Only Crazy | Julio Iglesias | Singer; songwriter; footballer | Myrugia | 1994–present | | |
| Love Memoir | Iman | Model | | 2021 | | |

== J ==
Key
| • | Denotes posthumous release |

List of scents / brands showing name, celebrity, occupation, label, production period, notes and references
| Scent / brand | Celebrity | Occupation(s) | Label | Prod. period | Notes | Ref. |
|---|---|---|---|---|---|---|
| Magic Beat: Unwind | Michael Jackson | Singer; songwriter; dancer | Max Factor | 1986–1988 | | |
| Magic Beat: Heartbeat | Michael Jackson | Singer; songwriter; dancer | Max Factor | 1986–1988 | | |
| Magic Beat: Wildfire | Michael Jackson | Singer; songwriter; dancer | Max Factor | 1986–1988 | | |
| Légende | Michael Jackson | Singer; songwriter; dancer | Triumph International Inc. | 1989–199? | | |
| Mystique | Michael Jackson | Singer; songwriter; dancer | Triumph International Inc. | 1989–199? | | |
| MJ King of Pop For Men | Michael Jackson | Singer; songwriter; dancer | MJ Mystery Holdings | 1999–200? | | |
| MJ King of Pop For Women | Michael Jackson | Singer; songwriter; dancer | MJ Mystery Holdings | 1999–200? | | |
| Heartbreaker by Jenna | Jenna Jameson | Pornographic actress | | 2009–present | | |
| You | Jacquees | Singer | Whiff | 2019–present | | |
| Gold | Jay-Z | Rapper | Parlux | 2013–present | | |
| Gold Extreme | Jay-Z | Rapper | Parlux | 2015–present | | |
| Driven | Derek Jeter | Baseball player | Avon Products | 2010–present | | |
| NJ x JV | Nick Jonas | Actor; singer; songwriter | John Varvatos | 2018–present | | |
| Michael Jordan | Michael Jordan | Basketball player | | 1996–present | | |
| Legend | Michael Jordan | Basketball player | | 1997–present | | |
| Jordan | Michael Jordan | Basketball player | | 2000–present | | |
| Jordan Balance | Michael Jordan | Basketball player | | | | |
| Jordan Drive | Michael Jordan | Basketball player | | | | |
| Jordan Energy | Michael Jordan | Basketball player | | | | |
| Jordan Power | Michael Jordan | Basketball player | | | | |
| 23 | Michael Jordan | Basketball player | | 2004–present | | |
| Flight | Michael Jordan | Basketball player | | 2011–present | | |
| Flight Challenge | Michael Jordan | Basketball player | | 2011–present | | |
| Flight Sport | Michael Jordan | Basketball player | | 2011–present | | |

== K ==
Key
| • | Denotes posthumous release |

List of scents / brands showing name, celebrity, occupation, label, production period, notes and references
| Scent / brand | Celebrity | Occupation(s) | Label | Prod. period | Notes | Ref. |
|---|---|---|---|---|---|---|
| Frida Kahlo • | Frida Kahlo | Artist | Frida Kahlo Corporation x Fantasy Fragrances, LLC | 2022–present | | |
| Unbreakable Bond | Khloe Kardashian, Lamar Odom | Socialite, Basketball player | Lighthouse Beauty | 2011–present | | |
| Unbreakable Love | Khloe Kardashian, Lamar Odom | Socialite, Basketball player | Lighthouse Beauty | 2012–present | | |
| Unbreakable Joy | Khloe Kardashian, Lamar Odom | Socialite, Basketball player | Lighthouse Beauty | 2013–present | | |
| Kim Kardashian | Kim Kardashian | Socialite | Lighthouse Beauty | 2009–present | | |
| Kim Kardashian Love | Kim Kardashian | Socialite | Lighthouse Beauty | 2011–present | | |
| Gold | Kim Kardashian | Socialite | Lighthouse Beauty | 2011–present | | |
| True Reflection | Kim Kardashian | Socialite | Lighthouse Beauty | 2012–present | | |
| Glam | Kim Kardashian | Socialite | Lighthouse Beauty | 2012–present | | |
| Pure Honey | Kim Kardashian | Socialite | Lighthouse Beauty | 2013–present | | |
| Fleur Fatale | Kim Kardashian | Socialite | Lighthouse Beauty | 2014–present | | |
| KKW Fragrance | Kim Kardashian | Socialite | KKW Beauty | 2017–2022 | 50+ scents associated with Kardashian, her family members, and floral designer Jeff Leatham. | |
| Andy Kaufman Milk & Cookies • | Andy Kaufman | Comedian | Xyrena | 2015–present | | |
| Mirror | Kaws | Artist | Comme des Garçons Parfum | 2021–present | | |
| Promenade Sur Le Rocher • | Grace Kelly | Actress; monarch | Grace de Monaco | 2021–present | | |
| Danse Etoilee • | Grace Kelly | Actress; monarch | Grace de Monaco | 2022–present | | |
| The Original | Robert F. Kennedy | Politician; member of Kennedy family | Eight and Bob | 1930s–? | | |
| Amphibia | Kermit the Frog | Muppet | January Productions | 1995–199? | | |
| Chaka | Chaka Khan | Singer | Independent / Self-released | 2023–present | Signature fragrance celebrating her music career, featuring notes of violet, ylang-ylang, bergamot, pink pepper, and patchouli. | |
| Tiger Eyes | Shahrukh Khan | Actor; producer; playback singer | Jeanne Arthes | 2005–present | | |
| In The Spirit of | Kelly Killoren Bensimon | Model; reality television personality | Original Scent | 2013–2016 | | |
| Kiss Her | Kiss | Band | | 2006–present | | |
| Kiss Him | Kiss | Band | | 2006–present | | |
| Hue | Hayley Kiyoko | Singer; musician | Slate Brands | 2021–present | | |
| Shine | Heidi Klum | Model | | 2011–present | | |
| Love Heartbeat 恋爱心跳 | Kym | Singer; actress | Love&Wish 爱唯施 | 2014–present | | |
| Love Magnet 挚爱磁石 | Kym | Singer; actress | Love&Wish 爱唯施 | 2014–present | | |
| Love Potion 真爱灵药 | Kym | Singer; actress | Love&Wish 爱唯施 | 2014–present | | |

== L ==
Key
| • | Denotes posthumous release |

List of scents / brands showing name, celebrity, occupation, label, production period, notes and references
| Scent / brand | Celebrity | Occupation(s) | Label | Prod. period | Notes | Ref. |
|---|---|---|---|---|---|---|
| Patti LaBelle | Patti LaBelle | Singer | | 1996–present | | |
| Girlfriend | Patti LaBelle | Singer | | 1998–present | | |
| Obscenity | Bruce LaBruce | Filmmaker; photographer | Jonathan Johnson | 2014–201? | | |
| Queen by Queen Latifah | Queen Latifah | Actress; rapper | | 2009–present | | |
| Queen of Hearts | Queen Latifah | Actress; rapper | | 2010–present | | |
| Black Star | Avril Lavigne | Singer | | 2009–present | | |
| Forbidden Rose | Avril Lavigne | Singer | | 2010–present | | |
| Wild Rose | Avril Lavigne | Singer | | 2011–present | | |
| Voodoo Rose | Jeff Leatham | Floral Artist | Scent Beauty | 2022–present | Leatham released six scents with Kim Kardashian between 2021 and 2022. | |
| Amanda | Amanda Lepore | Muse; Club Kid | Artware Editions | 2008–2016 | | |
| Dangerous Curves | Amanda Lepore | Muse; Club Kid | The Zoo | 2022–present | | |
| Adam Levine for Men | Adam Levine | Singer; TV host | Palm Beach Beauté | 2013–present | | |
| Adam Levine for Women | Adam Levine | Singer; TV host | Palm Beach Beauté | 2013–present | | |
| Leona Lewis for women | Leona Lewis | Singer | LR | 2009–present | | |
| Leona Lewis Summer Edition | Leona Lewis | Singer | LR | 2011–present | | |
| Gina by Gina Liano | Gina Liano | Barrister; actress; reality TV personality | Bondi Perfume Company | 2016–present | | |
| Gold Magic | Little Mix | Band | SAS Licences | 2015–present | | |
| Wishmaker | Little Mix | Band | SAS Licences | 2016–present | | |
| Wishmaker Party Edition | Little Mix | Band | SAS Licences | 2017–present | | |
| Style | Little Mix | Band | SAS Licences | 2018–present | | |
| Pink Diamond | Cher Lloyd | Singer; songwriter; rapper; model | | 2012–present | | |
| Ibiza Femme | Cathy Lobé | Socialite | Selectiva Spa | 2004–present | | |
| Ibiza for Men | Cathy Lobé | Socialite | Selectiva Spa | 2004–present | | |
| Pink Power | Cathy Lobé | Socialite | Selectiva Spa | 2008–present | | |
| Eva | Eva Longoria | Actress | Falic Fashion Group | 2010–present | | |
| EVAmour | Eva Longoria | Actress | Falic Fashion Group | 2012–present | | |
| Glow | Jennifer Lopez | Singer; actress | Coty | 2002–present | | |
| Still | Jennifer Lopez | Singer; actress | Coty | 2003–present | | |
| Live | Jennifer Lopez | Singer; actress | Coty | 2005–present | | |
| Miami Glow | Jennifer Lopez | Singer; actress | Coty | 2005–present | | |
| Love at First Glow | Jennifer Lopez | Singer; actress | Coty | 2005–present | | |
| Live Luxe | Jennifer Lopez | Singer; actress | Coty | 2006–present | | |
| Glow After Dark | Jennifer Lopez | Singer; actress | Coty | 2006–present | | |
| Glow: Shimmer Edition | Jennifer Lopez | Singer; actress | Coty | 2007–present | | |
| Glow After Dark: Shimmer Edition | Jennifer Lopez | Singer; actress | Coty | | | |
| Deseo | Jennifer Lopez | Singer; actress | Coty | 2008–present | | |
| Deseo for Men | Jennifer Lopez | Singer; actress | Coty | 2008–present | | |
| Deseo Forever | Jennifer Lopez | Singer; actress | Coty | 2008–present | | |
| Live Platinum | Jennifer Lopez | Singer; actress | Coty | 2008–present | | |
| My Glow | Jennifer Lopez | Singer; actress | Coty | 2009–present | | |
| Sunkissed Glow | Jennifer Lopez | Singer; actress | Coty | 2009–present | | |
| Love and Glamour | Jennifer Lopez | Singer; actress | Coty | 2010–present | | |
| L.A. Glow | Jennifer Lopez | Singer; actress | Coty | 2010–present | | |
| Blue Glow | Jennifer Lopez | Singer; actress | Coty | 2010–present | | |
| Love and Light | Jennifer Lopez | Singer; actress | Coty | 2011–present | | |
| Eau du Glow | Jennifer Lopez | Singer; actress | Coty | 2012–present | | |
| Glowing by JLo | Jennifer Lopez | Singer; actress | Coty | 2012–present | | |
| Jlove | Jennifer Lopez | Singer; actress | Coty | 2013–present | | |
| Rio Glow | Jennifer Lopez | Singer; actress | Coty | 2013–present | | |
| Forever Glowing | Jennifer Lopez | Singer; actress | Coty | 2013–present | | |
| Glowing Goddess | Jennifer Lopez | Singer; actress | Coty | 2014–present | | |
| Wild Glow | Jennifer Lopez | Singer; actress | Coty | 2014–present | | |
| JLust | Jennifer Lopez | Singer; actress | Coty | 2015–present | | |
| JLuxe | Jennifer Lopez | Singer; actress | Coty | 2015–present | | |
| Enduring Glow | Jennifer Lopez | Singer; actress | Coty | 2018–present | | |
| Promise | Jennifer Lopez | Singer; actress | Coty | 2019–present | | |
| Enduring Glow: Limited Edition | Jennifer Lopez | Singer; actress | Coty | 2020–present | | |
| One | Jennifer Lopez | Singer; actress | Coty | 2021–present | | |
| Sophia | Sophia Loren | Actress | Coty | 1980–199? | Sold as cologne concentrate, perfume, and parfum extrait | |
| 18 Amber Wood | Rob Lowe | Actor | Drom fragrances | 2016–present | | |

== M ==
Key
| • | Denotes posthumous release |

List of scents / brands showing name, celebrity, occupation, label, production period, notes and references
| Scent / brand | Celebrity | Occupation(s) | Label | Prod. period | Notes | Ref. |
|---|---|---|---|---|---|---|
| EH-VRITHENG | Ts Madison | Media personality; actress | Methra | 2023–present | | |
| Truth or Dare by Madonna | Madonna | Singer; actress | Coty | 2012–present | | |
| Truth or Dare by Madonna Naked | Madonna | Singer; actress | Coty | 2012–present | | |
| Madame X | Madonna | Singer; actress | | 2020–2021 | | |
| Formula 3 | Dalton Maldonado | Basketball player; activist | Xyrena | 2015–present | | |
| Amethyst | Maluma | Singer; actor | Royalty by Maluma | 2022–present | | |
| Garnet | Maluma | Singer; actor | Royalty by Maluma | 2022–present | | |
| Jade | Maluma | Singer; actor | Royalty by Maluma | 2022–present | | |
| Onyx | Maluma | Singer; actor | Royalty by Maluma | 2022–present | | |
| Niurka Plus Pheromones | Niurka Marcos | Actress; singer | | 2009–present | | |
| Cry Baby | Melanie Martinez | Singer | | 2016–2017 | | |
| Portals collection: Air of Clarity; Earthy Abundance; Fiery Passion; Water of Intuition | Melanie Martinez | Singer | Flower Shop Perfume Co. | 2023–present | | |
| Plastic by Trixie Mattel | Trixie Mattel | Drag queen; singer; songwriter | Xyrena | 2018–2022 | | |
| Wanted by Jesse | Jesse McCartney | Singer; actor | | | | |
| Soul2Soul | Tim McGraw | Singer | Coty | | | |
| McGraw | Tim McGraw | Singer | Coty | | | |
| McGraw Silver | Tim McGraw | Singer | Coty | | | |
| McGraw Southern Blend | Tim McGraw | Singer | Coty | | | |
| Tate 01 | Tate McRae | Singer . dancer | Scent Beauty | 2026-present | | |
| Shawn Mendes Signature | Shawn Mendes | Singer | Revlon | 2017–present | | |
| Signature II | Shawn Mendes | Singer | Revlon | 2018–present | | |
| Roses & Thorns | Bret Michaels | Singer; reality TV personality | HSN | 2014–2022 | | |
| Beautiful Soul | Bret Michaels | Singer; reality TV personality | | 2017–present | | |
| Moi | Miss Piggy | Muppet | Henson Company x Gendarme Fragrances | 1998–199? | | |
| Pink Friday | Nicki Minaj | Rapper; actress | Elizabeth Arden, Inc. | 2012–present | | |
| Pink Friday Special Edition | Nicki Minaj | Rapper; actress | Elizabeth Arden, Inc. | 2013–present | | |
| Pink Friday Deluxe Edition | Nicki Minaj | Rapper; actress | Elizabeth Arden, Inc. | 2013–present | | |
| Minajesty | Nicki Minaj | Rapper; actress | Elizabeth Arden, Inc. | 2013–present | | |
| Minajesty Exotic | Nicki Minaj | Rapper; actress | Elizabeth Arden, Inc. | 2014–present | | |
| Onika | Nicki Minaj | Rapper; actress | Elizabeth Arden, Inc. | 2014–present | | |
| The Pinkprint | Nicki Minaj | Rapper; actress | Elizabeth Arden, Inc. | 2015–present | | |
| Trini Girl | Nicki Minaj | Rapper; actress | Elizabeth Arden, Inc. | 2016–present | | |
| Queen | Nicki Minaj | Rapper; actress | Elizabeth Arden, Inc. | 2019–present | Released in connection with Minaj's album, Queen (2018). | |
| Pink Friday 2 | Nicki Minaj | Rapper; actress | Elizabeth Arden, Inc. | 2023–present | Released in connection with Minaj's album, Pink Friday 2. | |
| Darling | Kylie Minogue | Singer; songwriter; actress | Coty | 2006–present | | |
| Sweet Darling | Kylie Minogue | Singer; songwriter; actress | Coty | 2007–present | | |
| Sexy Darling | Kylie Minogue | Singer; songwriter; actress | Coty | 2008–present | | |
| Showtime (EDP & EDT) | Kylie Minogue | Singer; songwriter; actress | Coty | 2008–present | | |
| Couture | Kylie Minogue | Singer; songwriter; actress | Coty | 2009–present | | |
| Inverse | Kylie Minogue | Singer; songwriter; actress | Coty | 2009–present | | |
| Pink Sparkle | Kylie Minogue | Singer; songwriter; actress | Coty | 2010–present | | |
| Pink Sparkle POP | Kylie Minogue | Singer; songwriter; actress | Coty | 2011–present | | |
| Dazzling Darling | Kylie Minogue | Singer; songwriter; actress | Coty | 2011–present | | |
| Music Box | Kylie Minogue | Singer; songwriter; actress | Coty | 2012–present | | |
| Darling | Kylie Minogue | Singer; songwriter; actress | Scent Beauty | 2022–present | | |
| Disco Darling | Kylie Minogue | Singer; songwriter; actress | Scent Beauty | 2022–present | | |
| AGNEZ Rêve | Agnez Mo | Singer | Continental Cosmetic in association with Corbeau International | 2013–present | | |
| Karen Mok the Fragrance | Karen Mok | Entertainer | | 2008–present | | |
| Tana by Tana | Tana Mongeau | YouTube personality | Merveilleux Beauty | 2020 | | |
| Sonja by Sonja Morgan | Sonja Morgan | Socialite; reality TV personality | Sonja by Sonja Morgan | 2018–present | | |
| Sonja Morgan | Sonja Morgan | Socialite; reality TV personality | Sonja by Sonja Morgan | 2018–2020 | | |
| Kate | Kate Moss | Model | Coty | 2007–present | | |
| Kate by Kate Moss: Luxury Edition | Kate Moss | Model | Coty | 2008–present | | |
| Velvet Hour | Kate Moss | Model | Coty | 2008–present | | |
| Kate Summer Time | Kate Moss | Model | Coty | 2009–present | | |
| Vintage | Kate Moss | Model | Coty | 2009–present | | |
| Vintage Muse | Kate Moss | Model | Coty | 2009–present | | |
| Wild Meadow | Kate Moss | Model | Coty | 2010–present | | |
| Lilabelle | Kate Moss | Model | Coty | 2011–present | | |
| Love Blossoms | Kate Moss | Model | Coty | 2011–present | | |
| Lilabelle Truly Adorable | Kate Moss | Model | Coty | 2012–present | | |
| Sacred Mist | Kate Moss | Model | Cosmoss | 2022–present | | |
| Lottie Moss | Lottie Moss | Model | Scent Beauty | 2021–present | | |
| Grabman | Randy Moss | Athlete | | 2006–early 2010's | | |

== N ==
Key
| • | Denotes posthumous release |

List of scents / brands showing name, celebrity, occupation, label, production period, notes and references
| Scent / brand | Celebrity | Occupation(s) | Label | Prod. period | Notes | Ref. |
|---|---|---|---|---|---|---|
| Apple Bottoms by Nelly | Nelly | Rapper; singer; songwriter; entrepreneur | Apple Bottoms | 2009–present | Along with its clear, base scent, there are Apple Bottoms varieties, such as Red Delicious and Blue Sexy to the Core, as well as others that don't appear to have names, but are distinguished by their colors and distinctive scents. | |

== O ==
Key
| • | Denotes posthumous release |

List of scents / brands showing name, celebrity, occupation, label, production period, notes and references
| Scent / brand | Celebrity | Occupation(s) | Label | Prod. period | Notes | Ref. |
|---|---|---|---|---|---|---|
| Scent Studio | Mary-Kate and Ashley Olsen | Actresses; fashion designers; businesswomen | Olsenboye | —N/a | Set of six mix-and-match fragrance vials | |
| One | Mary-Kate and Ashley Olsen | Actresses; fashion designers; businesswomen | Olsenboye | 2003–present | | |
| Two | Mary-Kate and Ashley Olsen | Actresses; fashion designers; businesswomen | Olsenboye | 2003–present | | |
| South Beach Chic | Mary-Kate and Ashley Olsen | Actresses; fashion designers; businesswomen | Olsenboye | 2003–present | | |
| L.A. Style | Mary-Kate and Ashley Olsen | Actresses; fashion designers; businesswomen | Olsenboye | 2006–present | | |
| N.Y. Chic | Mary-Kate and Ashley Olsen | Actresses; fashion designers; businesswomen | Olsenboye | 2006–present | | |
| Hamptons Style | Mary-Kate and Ashley Olsen | Actresses; fashion designers; businesswomen | Olsenboye | 2007–present | | |
| Coast to Coast: L.A. Beach | Mary-Kate and Ashley Olsen | Actresses; fashion designers; businesswomen | Olsenboye | —N/a | | |
| Coast to Coast: N.Y.C. Star | Mary-Kate and Ashley Olsen | Actresses; fashion designers; businesswomen | Olsenboye | —N/a | | |
| Coast to Coast: Malibu Style | Mary-Kate and Ashley Olsen | Actresses; fashion designers; businesswomen | Olsenboye | —N/a | | |
| Coast to Coast: London Beat | Mary-Kate and Ashley Olsen | Actresses; fashion designers; businesswomen | Olsenboye | —N/a | | |
| Coast to Coast: Soho Chic | Mary-Kate and Ashley Olsen | Actresses; fashion designers; businesswomen | Olsenboye | —N/a | | |
| Coast to Coast: Tokyo Fusion | Mary-Kate and Ashley Olsen | Actresses; fashion designers; businesswomen | Olsenboye | —N/a | | |
| Nirvana Black | Mary-Kate and Ashley Olsen | Actresses; fashion designers; businesswomen | Elizabeth & James | 2013–present | | |
| Nirvana White | Mary-Kate and Ashley Olsen | Actresses; fashion designers; businesswomen | Elizabeth & James | 2013–present | | |
| Nirvana Amethyst | Mary-Kate and Ashley Olsen | Actresses; fashion designers; businesswomen | Elizabeth & James | 2013–present | | |
| Nirvana Bourbon | Mary-Kate and Ashley Olsen | Actresses; fashion designers; businesswomen | Elizabeth & James | 2016–present | | |
| Nirvana Rose | Mary-Kate and Ashley Olsen | Actresses; fashion designers; businesswomen | Elizabeth & James | 2016–present | | |
| Nirvana French Grey | Mary-Kate and Ashley Olsen | Actresses; fashion designers; businesswomen | Elizabeth & James | 2017–present | | |
| Our Moment | One Direction | Band | | 2013–present | | |
| That Moment | One Direction | Band | | 2014–present | | |
| You and I | One Direction | Band | | 2014–present | | |
| Between Us | One Direction | Band | | 2015–present | | |

== P ==
Key
| • | Denotes posthumous release |

List of scents / brands showing name, celebrity, occupation, label, production period, notes and references
| Scent / brand | Celebrity | Occupation(s) | Label | Prod. period | Notes | Ref. |
|---|---|---|---|---|---|---|
| Juliana Paes | Juliana Paes | Actress; television presenter; former model | Essence Feminino Eau de Toilette | —N/a | | |
| This Smells Like My Vagina | Gwyneth Paltrow | Actress; businesswoman | Goop x Heretic Parfum | 2020–present | | |
| This Smells Like My Orgasm | Gwyneth Paltrow | Actress; businesswoman | Goop x Heretic Parfum | 2020–present | | |
| Lovely | Sarah Jessica Parker | Actress | | 2005–present | | |
| Covet | Sarah Jessica Parker | Actress | | 2007–present | | |
| SJP NYC | Sarah Jessica Parker | Actress | | 2009–present | | |
| Scent From Above | Dolly Parton | Actress; businesswoman; singer; songwriter | ScentBeauty | 2021–present | | |
| Smoky Mountain | Dolly Parton | Actress; businesswoman; singer; songwriter | ScentBeauty | 2022–present | | |
| Early Morning Breeze | Dolly Parton | Actress; businesswoman; singer; songwriter | ScentBeauty | 2022–present | | |
| Tennessee Sunset | Dolly Parton | Actress; businesswoman; singer; songwriter | ScentBeauty | 2022–present | | |
| Dancing Fireflies | Dolly Parton | Actress; businesswoman; singer; songwriter | ScentBeauty | 2022–present | | |
| Luciano Pavarotti | Luciano Pavarotti | Tenor | Eurocosmesi | 1994 | Perfumer: David Apel | |
| Pavarotti Donna | Luciano Pavarotti | Tenor | Eurocosmesi | 1995 | | |
| Luciano | Luciano Pavarotti | Tenor | Eurocosmesi | 1999 | | |
| Flazéda | Pearl | Drag Performer | Xyrena | 2017 | | |
| Purr | Katy Perry | Singer | Gigantic Parfums | 2010–present | | |
| Meow | Katy Perry | Singer | Gigantic Parfums | 2011–present | | |
| Killer Queen | Katy Perry | Singer | Coty | 2013–present | | |
| Killer Queen Oh So Sheer | Katy Perry | Singer | Coty | 2014–present | | |
| Royal Revolution | Katy Perry | Singer | Coty | 2014–present | | |
| Mad Potion | Katy Perry | Singer | Coty | 2015–present | | |
| Spring Reign | Katy Perry | Singer | Coty | 2015–present | | |
| Mad Love | Katy Perry | Singer | Coty | 2016–present | | |
| Indi | Katy Perry | Singer | Coty | 2017–present | | |
| Indi Visible | Katy Perry | Singer | Coty | 2018–present | | |
| Henry Rose | Michelle Pfeiffer | Actress | International Flavors & Fragrances | 2019–present | Brand with 8+ scents. | |
| Pitbull Man | Pitbull | Rapper; entrepreneur; philanthropist | | 2013–present | | |
| Pitbull Woman | Pitbull | Rapper; entrepreneur; philanthropist | | 2013–present | | |
| Pitbull Miami Man | Pitbull | Rapper; entrepreneur; philanthropist | | 2015–present | | |
| Pitbull Miami Woman | Pitbull | Rapper; entrepreneur; philanthropist | | 2015–present | | |
| Cuba Man | Pitbull | Rapper; entrepreneur; philanthropist | | 2017–present | | |
| Cuba Woman | Pitbull | Rapper; entrepreneur; philanthropist | | 2017–present | | |
| Snooki | Nicole "Snooki" Polizzi | Reality TV personality | | 2011–present | | |
| Snooki Couture | Nicole "Snooki" Polizzi | Reality TV personality | | 2012–present | | |
| Snooki Love | Nicole "Snooki" Polizzi | Reality TV personality | | 2014–present | | |
| Teddy Bear | Elvis Presley | Singer; actor | Elvis Presley Enterprises, Inc. | 1957–195? | | |
| Elvis by Elvis Presley • | Elvis Presley | Singer; actor | Frances Denney | 1989–199? | | |
| Legend For Him • | Elvis Presley | Singer; actor | HSN | —N/a | | |
| Legend For Her • | Elvis Presley | Singer; actor | HSN | —N/a | | |
| Elvis • | Elvis Presley | Singer; actor | Elvis Fragrances, Inc. | 1991–199? | | |
| Elvis Forever • | Elvis Presley | Singer; actor | Theany Cosmetics | 1994–199? | | |
| Elvis Forever For Him & Her • | Elvis Presley | Singer; actor | Bellevue Perfumes | 2019–present | | |
| Moments | Priscilla Presley | Actress; businesswoman | Procter & Gamble | 1990–present | | |
| Experiences | Priscilla Presley | Actress; businesswoman | Procter & Gamble | 1993–present | | |
| Indian Summer | Priscilla Presley | Actress; businesswoman | Procter & Gamble | 1995–present | | |
| Roses & More | Priscilla Presley | Actress; businesswoman | Procter & Gamble | 1998–present | | |
| Golden Moments | Priscilla Presley | Actress; businesswoman | Procter & Gamble | 1999–present | | |
| Indian Summer Blue | Priscilla Presley | Actress; businesswoman | Procter & Gamble | 2000–present | | |
| Indian Summer Green | Priscilla Presley | Actress; businesswoman | Procter & Gamble | 2000–present | | |
| Indian Summer Red | Priscilla Presley | Actress; businesswoman | Procter & Gamble | 2000–present | | |
| Stunning | Katie Price | Model | Robertet | 2007–present | | |
| 3121 | Prince | Musician; actor | Revelations | 2006–present | | |

== R ==
Key
| • | Denotes posthumous release |

List of scents / brands showing name, celebrity, occupation, label, production period, notes and references
| Scent / brand | Celebrity | Occupation(s) | Label | Prod. period | Notes | Ref. |
|---|---|---|---|---|---|---|
| Chill AF | Addison Rae | TikTok personality; singer | Hampton Beauty | 2021–present | | |
| Happy AF | Addison Rae | TikTok personality; singer | Hampton Beauty | 2021–present | | |
| Hyped AF | Addison Rae | TikTok personality; singer | Hampton Beauty | 2021–present | | |
| Jasmine of India | Lisa Ray | Actor | The 7 Virtues | 2016–present | | |
| Shark by Tara | Tara Reid | Actress | | 2014–present | | |
| Denise Richards | Denise Richards | Actress | | 2014–present | | |
| Hello by Lionel Richie pour femme | Lionel Richie | Singer; reality TV personality | | 2019–present | | |
| Hello by Lionel Richie pour homme | Lionel Richie | Singer; reality TV personality | | 2019–present | | |
| Easy Like Sunday Morning | Lionel Richie | Singer; reality TV personality | | 2023–present | | |
| Nicole | Nicole Richie | Reality TV personality; fashion designer | TPR Holdings | 2012–present | | |
| No Rules | Nicole Richie | Reality TV personality; fashion designer | TPR Holdings | 2012–present | | |
| Nude | Rihanna | Singer; actress; fashion designer; businesswoman | Parlux | 2012–present | A 2013 collector's edition, 777 Nude, contains an identical fragrance formula but an updated bottle. | |
| Rebelle | Rihanna | Singer; actress; fashion designer; businesswoman | Parlux | 2012–present | | |
| Reb'l Fleur | Rihanna | Singer; actress; fashion designer; businesswoman | Parlux | 2012–present | | |
| Rogue | Rihanna | Singer; actress; fashion designer; businesswoman | Parlux | 2013–present | | |
| Rogue Love | Rihanna | Singer; actress; fashion designer; businesswoman | Parlux | 2014–present | | |
| Rogue Man | Rihanna | Singer; actress; fashion designer; businesswoman | Parlux | 2014–present | | |
| Riri | Rihanna | Singer; actress; fashion designer; businesswoman | Parlux | 2015–present | | |
| Crush | Rihanna | Singer; actress; fashion designer; businesswoman | Parlux | 2016–present | | |
| Kiss | Rihanna | Singer; actress; fashion designer; businesswoman | Parlux | 2017–present | | |
| Reb'l Fleur Love Always | Rihanna | Singer; actress; fashion designer; businesswoman | Parlux | 2018–present | | |
| Fenty Parfum | Rihanna | Singer; actress; fashion designer; businesswoman | Fenty Beauty x LVMH | 2021–present | | |
| Reina | Chiquis Rivera | Singer | Whiff | 2019–present | | |
| El | Jenni Rivera | Singer | Jenni Rivera Fashion | | | |
| El Sport | Jenni Rivera | Singer | Jenni Rivera Fashion | | | |
| JR | Jenni Rivera | Singer | Jenni Rivera Fashion | | | |
| Mariposa | Jenni Rivera | Singer | Jenni Rivera Fashion | | | |
| Jenni | Jenni Rivera | Singer | Jenni Rivera Fashion | 2009–present | | |
| Forever • | Jenni Rivera | Singer | Jenni Rivera Fashion | 2013–present | | |
| Now & Forever | Joan Rivers | Comedian; TV personality | QVC | 2001–present | | |
| Black Lilac | Joan Rivers | Comedian; TV personality | QVC | 2001–present | | |
| Freesia | Joan Rivers | Comedian; TV personality | QVC | 2001–present | | |
| Tuberose | Joan Rivers | Comedian; TV personality | QVC | 2001–present | | |
| Water Maze | Joan Rivers | Comedian; TV personality | QVC | 2001–present | | |
| Pink Flowers | Joan Rivers | Comedian; TV personality | QVC | 2004–present | | |
| Now & Forever Private Reserve | Joan Rivers | Comedian; TV personality | QVC | 2013–present | | |
| RS No. 9 / Subversive Scents (Satisfaction, Wild Horses, Sticky Fingers, Urban Jungle, Paint It Black) | The Rolling Stones | Band; Musicians | Nirvana Brands / The Perfume Shop | 2024–present | Debut fragrance (RS No. 9) followed by the genderless "Subversive Scents" collection inspired by iconic tracks. | |
| RS No. 9 | The Rolling Stones | Band; Musicians | Nirvana Brands / The Perfume Shop | 2024–present | Named after the band's flagship store on Carnaby Street, London; formulated by Catherine Selig. | |
| Satisfaction | The Rolling Stones | Band; Musicians | Nirvana Brands / The Perfume Shop | 2025–present | Part of the Subversive Scents collection, inspired by the 1965 single. | |
| Wild Horses | The Rolling Stones | Band; Musicians | Nirvana Brands / The Perfume Shop | 2025–present | Part of the Subversive Scents collection, inspired by the 1971 single. | |
| Sticky Fingers | The Rolling Stones | Band; Musicians | Nirvana Brands / The Perfume Shop | 2025–present | Part of the Subversive Scents collection, inspired by the 1971 album. | |
| Urban Jungle / Paint It Black | The Rolling Stones | Band; Musicians | Nirvana Brands / The Perfume Shop | 2025–present | Part of the Subversive Scents collection, inspired by the 1990s tour and 1966 single respectively. | |
| Cristiano Ronaldo Legacy | Cristiano Ronaldo | Football player | Eden Parfums | 2015–present | | |
| Diamond Diana | Diana Ross | Singer | Simon James London | 2017–present | | |
| Manifesto | Isabella Rossellini | Actress; model | Coty | 2000–present | | |
| IsaBella | Isabella Rossellini | Actress; model | Coty | 2002–present | | |
| My Manifesto | Isabella Rossellini | Actress; model | Coty | 2003–present | | |
| Daring | Isabella Rossellini | Actress; model | Coty | 2005–present | | |
| Storia | Isabella Rossellini | Actress; model | Coty | 2006–present | | |
| Oro | Paulina Rubio | Singer | | 2009–present | | |
| Glamazon | RuPaul | Actor; host; singer; drag queen | Colorevolution | 2013–2015 | | |

== S ==
Key
| • | Denotes posthumous release |

List of scents / brands showing name, celebrity, occupation, label, production period, notes and references
| Scent / brand | Celebrity | Occupation(s) | Label | Prod. period | Notes | Ref. |
|---|---|---|---|---|---|---|
| Bolero | Gabriela Sabatini | Tennis player | | 1997–present | | |
| Carlos Santana for Men | Carlos Santana | Singer; guitarist | Victory International | 2005–present | | |
| Carlos Santana for Women | Carlos Santana | Singer; guitarist | Victory International | 2005–present | | |
| Mi Acorde Él | Alejandro Sanz | Musician | Tailored Perfumes | 2019–present | | |
| Mi Acorde Ella | Alejandro Sanz | Musician | Tailored Perfumes | | | |
| Chosen | Nicole Scherzinger | Singer; television host | Nicole Scherzinger Perfumes | 2017–present | | |
| Day | Nicole Scherzinger | Singer; television host | Nicole Scherzinger Perfumes | 2018–present | | |
| Night | Nicole Scherzinger | Singer; television host | Nicole Scherzinger Perfumes | 2018–present | | |
| By Nicole | Nicole Scherzinger | Singer; television host | Nicole Scherzinger Perfumes | 2018–present | Four body mists: Chosen Untouched, Hypnotic Bloom, Desert Sunset, and Caramel Latte. | |
| Daring | Nicole Scherzinger | Singer; television host | Nicole Scherzinger Perfumes | 2019–present | | |
| Space Rage | Travis Scott | Rapper | Cactus Jack x Byredo | 2020–2021 | | |
| Little Flower | Chloë Sevigny | Actress | Régime des Fleurs | 2019–present | | |
| Her Open Hearts | Jane Seymour | Actress | Simon James London | 2017–present | | |
| His Open Hearts | Jane Seymour | Actress | Simon James London | 2017–present | | |
| S by Shakira | Shakira | Singer | Shakira Perfumes | 2010–present | | |
| S by Shakira Eau Florale | Shakira | Singer | Shakira Perfumes | 2011–present | | |
| Elixir | Shakira | Singer | Shakira Perfumes | 2012–present | | |
| Wild Elixir | Shakira | Singer | Shakira Perfumes | 2013–present | | |
| S by Shakira Aquamarine | Shakira | Singer | Shakira Perfumes | 2013–present | | |
| Aphrodisiac Elixir | Shakira | Singer | Shakira Perfumes | 2014–present | | |
| Rock! | Shakira | Singer | Shakira Perfumes | 2014–present | | |
| Love Rock! | Shakira | Singer | Shakira Perfumes | 2015–present | | |
| Paradise Elixir | Shakira | Singer | Shakira Perfumes | 2015–present | | |
| Pop Rock! | Shakira | Singer | Shakira Perfumes | 2016–present | | |
| Magnetic Elixir | Shakira | Singer | Shakira Perfumes | 2016–present | | |
| Dance | Shakira | Singer | Shakira Perfumes | 2016–present | | |
| Summer Rock! Fruity Vibes | Shakira | Singer | Shakira Perfumes | 2016–present | | |
| Summer Rock! Sweet Candy | Shakira | Singer | Shakira Perfumes | 2016–present | | |
| S Eau Florale Sparkling Love | Shakira | Singer | Shakira Perfumes | 2016–present | | |
| S Sparking Stars | Shakira | Singer | Shakira Perfumes | 2016–present | | |
| S Kiss | Shakira | Singer | Shakira Perfumes | 2017–present | | |
| Dance Diamonds (Under the Rain) | Shakira | Singer | Shakira Perfumes | 2017–present | | |
| Love Rock! Deluxe | Shakira | Singer | Shakira Perfumes | 2017–present | | |
| I Am Rock! | Shakira | Singer | Shakira Perfumes | 2017–present | | |
| Rock! The Party Crazy Lilac | Shakira | Singer | Shakira Perfumes | 2017–present | | |
| Rock! The Party Daring Pink | Shakira | Singer | Shakira Perfumes | 2017–present | | |
| Miss S | Shakira | Singer | Shakira Perfumes | 2018–present | | |
| Dance Alegría | Shakira | Singer | Shakira Perfumes | 2018–present | | |
| Dream | Shakira | Singer | Shakira Perfumes | 2018–present | | |
| Rock! The Night | Shakira | Singer | Shakira Perfumes | 2018–present | | |
| Rock! The Night For Men | Shakira | Singer | Shakira Perfumes | 2018–present | | |
| We Rock! For Women | Shakira | Singer | Shakira Perfumes | 2019–present | | |
| We Rock! For Men | Shakira | Singer | Shakira Perfumes | 2019–present | | |
| Sweet Dream | Shakira | Singer | Shakira Perfumes | 2019–present | | |
| Dance Magnetic | Shakira | Singer | Shakira Perfumes | 2019–present | | |
| Dance Moonlight | Shakira | Singer | Shakira Perfumes | 2019–present | | |
| S Smile | Shakira | Singer | Shakira Perfumes | 2019–present | | |
| S Sugar | Shakira | Singer | Shakira Perfumes | 2020–present | | |
| Dance Midnight | Shakira | Singer | Shakira Perfumes | 2020–present | | |
| Dance Red Midnight | Shakira | Singer | Shakira Perfumes | 2021–present | | |
| Maria Sharapova | Maria Sharapova | Tennis player | Paralux | 2005–present | | |
| Pour Femme | Omar Sharif | Actor | Prestige International Distribution | 1990–present | | |
| Pour Homme | Omar Sharif | Actor | Prestige International Distribution | 1992–present | | |
| Ignis | Omar Sharif | Actor | Prestige International Distribution | 1994–present | | |
| Nubiade | Omar Sharif | Actor | Prestige International Distribution | 1994–present | | |
| Conviction for Men & Women | Omar Sharif | Actor | Prestige International Distribution | 1999–present | | |
| Baby Phat Goddess | Kimora Lee Simmons | Model; fashion designer | Coty | 2005–present | | |
| Baby Phat Golden Goddess | Kimora Lee Simmons | Model; fashion designer | Coty | 2006–present | | |
| Baby Phat Seductive Goddess | Kimora Lee Simmons | Model; fashion designer | Coty | 2008–present | | |
| Baby Phat Fabulosity | Kimora Lee Simmons | Model; fashion designer | Coty | 2008–present | | |
| Baby Phat Dare Me | Kimora Lee Simmons | Model; fashion designer | Coty | 2010–present | | |
| Baby Phat Luv Me | Kimora Lee Simmons | Model; fashion designer | Coty | 2011–present | | |
| Phat Farm Atman Spirit | Russell Simmons | Former record executive; film producer; entrepreneur | Coty | 2006–present | | |
| Dessert Treats series: Creamy Dessert; Dessert Treats Candy; Dessert Treats Cupcake; Dessert Treats Hula Girl; Dessert Treats Vanilla Ice Cream; Dreamy Dessert; Juicy Dessert; Taste'' | Jessica Simpson | Singer; reality television personality; fashion designer | | 2004–present | Series of eight fragrances and body sprays. | |
| Fancy series: Fancy; Fancy Love; Fancy Nights; I Fancy You; Fancy Girl; Fancy Forever | Jessica Simpson | Singer; reality television personality; fashion designer | | 2008–present | Series of six fragrances. | |
| Vintage Bloom | Jessica Simpson | Singer; reality television personality; fashion designer | | 2012–present | | |
| Jessica Simpson | Jessica Simpson | Singer; reality television personality; fashion designer | | 2014–present | | |
| Ten | Jessica Simpson | Singer; reality television personality; fashion designer | | 2015–present | | |
| Fiend | Jessica Simpson | Singer; reality television personality; fashion designer | | 2020–present | | |
| Silhouette | Christian Siriano | Reality television personality; fashion designer | Christian Siriano Fragrances | 2014–present | | |
| Intimate Silhouette | Christian Siriano | Reality television personality; fashion designer | Christian Siriano Fragrances | 2018–present | | |
| Silhouette in Bloom | Christian Siriano | Reality television personality; fashion designer | Christian Siriano Fragrances | 2018–present | | |
| People Are People | Christian Siriano | Reality television personality; fashion designer | Christian Siriano Fragrances | 2018–present | | |
| Midnight Silhouette | Christian Siriano | Reality television personality; fashion designer | Christian Siriano Fragrances | 2019–present | | |
| Ooh La Rouge | Christian Siriano | Reality television personality; fashion designer | Christian Siriano Fragrances | 2020–present | | |
| Silhouette Au Naturel | Christian Siriano | Reality television personality; fashion designer | Christian Siriano Fragrances | 2022–present | | |
| TLY 5755 | Troye Sivan | Singer; actor | Tsu Lange Yor | 2023–present | | |
| Pool | Troye Sivan | Singer; actor | Tsu Lange Yor | 2023–present | | |
| Luca | Troye Sivan | Singer; actor | Tsu Lange Yor | 2023–present | | |
| Be You | Jojo Siwa | Dancer; singer; actress; YouTube & reality television personality | Nickelodeon | 2018–present | | |
| Tabe | Tabe Slioor | Socialite | | 1963–1965 | | |
| Explicit | Naomi Smalls | Drag artist | Akna | 2023–present | | |
| Jaclyn Smith's California | Jaclyn Smith | Actress | Max Factor | 1989–199? | | |
| California for Men | Jaclyn Smith | Actress | Max Factor | 1990–199? | | |
| Because of You... | Jordin Sparks | Singer | | 2010–present | | |
| Curious | Britney Spears | Singer | Elizabeth Arden, Inc. | 2004–present | | |
| Fantasy | Britney Spears | Singer | Elizabeth Arden, Inc. | 2005–present | | |
| Curious: In Control | Britney Spears | Singer | Elizabeth Arden, Inc. | 2006–present | | |
| Midnight Fantasy | Britney Spears | Singer | Elizabeth Arden, Inc. | 2006–present | | |
| Believe | Britney Spears | Singer | Elizabeth Arden, Inc. | 2007–present | | |
| Curious Heart | Britney Spears | Singer | Elizabeth Arden, Inc. | 2008–present | | |
| Hidden Fantasy | Britney Spears | Singer | Elizabeth Arden, Inc. | 2009–present | | |
| Circus Fantasy | Britney Spears | Singer | Elizabeth Arden, Inc. | 2009–present | Released in connection with Spears' 6th studio album Circus and The song of the same name | |
| Radiance | Britney Spears | Singer | Elizabeth Arden, Inc. | 2010–present | | |
| Cosmic Radiance | Britney Spears | Singer | Elizabeth Arden, Inc. | 2011–present | | |
| Fantasy Twist | Britney Spears | Singer | Elizabeth Arden, Inc. | 2012–present | | |
| Island Fantasy | Britney Spears | Singer | Elizabeth Arden, Inc. | 2013–present | | |
| Fantasy: Anniversary Edition | Britney Spears | Singer | Elizabeth Arden, Inc. | 2013–present | | |
| Fantasy: The Nice Remix | Britney Spears | Singer | Elizabeth Arden, Inc. | 2014–present | | |
| Fantasy: The Naughty Remix | Britney Spears | Singer | Elizabeth Arden, Inc. | 2014–present | | |
| Fantasy: The Stage Edition | Britney Spears | Singer | Elizabeth Arden, Inc. | 2014–present | | |
| Rocker Femme Fantasy | Britney Spears | Singer | Elizabeth Arden, Inc. | 2014–present | | |
| Fantasy Intimate Edition | Britney Spears | Singer | Elizabeth Arden, Inc. | 2015–present | | |
| Maui Fantasy | Britney Spears | Singer | Elizabeth Arden, Inc. | 2016–present | | |
| Private Show | Britney Spears | Singer | Elizabeth Arden, Inc. | 2016–present | | |
| Fantasy in Bloom | Britney Spears | Singer | Elizabeth Arden, Inc. | 2017–present | | |
| VIP Private Show | Britney Spears | Singer | Elizabeth Arden, Inc. | 2017–present | | |
| Sunset Fantasy | Britney Spears | Singer | Elizabeth Arden, Inc. | 2018–present | | |
| Prerogative | Britney Spears | Singer | Revlon, Inc. | 2018–present | | |
| Pride Edition Fantasy | Britney Spears | Singer | Elizabeth Arden, Inc. | 2018–present | | |
| Rainbow Fantasy | Britney Spears | Singer | Elizabeth Arden, Inc. | 2019–present | | |
| Prerogative Rave | Britney Spears | Singer | Elizabeth Arden, Inc. | 2019–present | | |
| Glitter Fantasy | Britney Spears | Singer | Elizabeth Arden, Inc. | 2020–present | | |
| Festive Fantasy | Britney Spears | Singer | Elizabeth Arden, Inc. | 2020–present | | |
| Prerogative Ego | Britney Spears | Singer | Elizabeth Arden, Inc. | 2020–present | | |
| Festive Fantasy | Britney Spears | Singer | Elizabeth Arden, Inc. | 2021–present | | |
| Electric Fantasy | Britney Spears | Singer | Elizabeth Arden, Inc. | 2021–present | | |
| Fantasy Intense | Britney Spears | Singer | Elizabeth Arden, Inc. | 2021–present | | |
| Blissful Fantasy | Britney Spears | Singer | Elizabeth Arden, Inc. | 2022–present | | |
| Jungle Fantasy | Britney Spears | Singer | Elizabeth Arden, Inc. | 2023–present | | |
| Spice Girls Impulse | Spice Girls | Girl group | Impulse Fragrances | 1997–200? | | |
| Marek SSC Napoli | SSC Napoli | Football team | | 2010–present | | |
| Danielle by Danielle Steel | Danielle Steel | Author | | 2006–present | | |
| L: L.A.M.B. | Gwen Stefani | Singer; fashion designer; television host | Coty | 2007–present | | |
| Harajuku Lovers Collection | Gwen Stefani | Singer; fashion designer; television host | | 2008–present | Collection of five fragrances inspired by Stefani and the four Harajuku Girls. | |
| Harajuku Lovers: Snow Bunnies Collection | Gwen Stefani | Singer; fashion designer; television host | | 2009 | Collection of five fragrances inspired by Stefani and the four Harajuku Girls. | |
| Harajuku Lovers: Sunshine Cuties Collection | Gwen Stefani | Singer; fashion designer; television host | | 2009 | Collection of five fragrances inspired by Stefani and the four Harajuku Girls. | |
| Harajuku Lovers: Wicked Style Collection | Gwen Stefani | Singer; fashion designer; television host | | 2010 | Collection of five fragrances inspired by Stefani and the four Harajuku Girls. | |
| G of the Sea | Gwen Stefani | Singer; fashion designer; television host | | 2011 | Bottle features Stefani's cartoon avatar as a mermaid. | |
| Super G | Gwen Stefani | Singer; fashion designer; television host | | 2011 | Bottle features Stefani's cartoon avatar as a superhero. | |
| Jingle G | Gwen Stefani | Singer; fashion designer; television host | | 2011 | Bottle features Stefani's cartoon avatar in a Santa suit. | |
| Harajuku Lovers: Pop Electric Collection | Gwen Stefani | Singer; fashion designer; television host | | 2014 | Collection of five fragrances inspired by Stefani and the four Harajuku Girls. | |
| There's Closeness | Harry Styles | Singer; actor | Pleasing | 2023–present | | |
| Rivulets | Harry Styles | Singer; actor | Pleasing | 2023–present | | |
| Bright, Hot | Harry Styles | Singer; actor | Pleasing | 2023–present | | |
| Wonderstruck | Taylor Swift | Singer | Elizabeth Arden, Inc. | 2011–? | | |
| Wonderstruck Enchanted | Taylor Swift | Singer | Elizabeth Arden, Inc. | 2012–? | | |
| Taylor | Taylor Swift | Singer | Elizabeth Arden, Inc. | 2013–? | | |
| Taylor Made of Starlight | Taylor Swift | Singer | Elizabeth Arden, Inc. | 2014–? | | |
| Incredible Things | Taylor Swift | Singer | Elizabeth Arden, Inc. | 2014–? | | |
| Like This | Tilda Swinton | Actress | Etat Libre d'Orange | 2010–? | | |

== T ==
Key
| • | Denotes posthumous release |

List of scents / brands showing name, celebrity, occupation, label, production period, notes and references
| Scent / brand | Celebrity | Occupation(s) | Label | Prod. period | Notes | Ref. |
|---|---|---|---|---|---|---|
| Choices by Tatianna | Tatianna | Singer; drag performer | Xyrena | 2018–2022 | | |
| Passion | Elizabeth Taylor | Actress | Elizabeth Arden, Inc. | 1988–present | | |
| Passion for Men | Elizabeth Taylor | Actress | Elizabeth Arden, Inc. | 1989–present | | |
| Passion for Men: Cologne Concentree | Elizabeth Taylor | Actress | Elizabeth Arden, Inc. | 1990–present | | |
| White Diamonds | Elizabeth Taylor | Actress | Elizabeth Arden, Inc. | 1991–present | Parfum, EDP, and EDT editions vary. | |
| Diamonds and Emeralds | Elizabeth Taylor | Actress | Elizabeth Arden, Inc. | 1993–present | | |
| Diamonds and Rubies | Elizabeth Taylor | Actress | Elizabeth Arden, Inc. | 1993–present | | |
| Diamonds and Sapphires | Elizabeth Taylor | Actress | Elizabeth Arden, Inc. | 1993–present | | |
| Black Pearls | Elizabeth Taylor | Actress | Elizabeth Arden, Inc. | 1996–present | | |
| Sparkling White Diamonds | Elizabeth Taylor | Actress | Elizabeth Arden, Inc. | 1999–present | | |
| Brilliant White Diamonds | Elizabeth Taylor | Actress | Elizabeth Arden, Inc. | 2001–present | | |
| Forever Elizabeth | Elizabeth Taylor | Actress | Elizabeth Arden, Inc. | 2002–present | | |
| Gardenia | Elizabeth Taylor | Actress | Elizabeth Arden, Inc. | 2003–present | | |
| Violet Eyes | Elizabeth Taylor | Actress | Elizabeth Arden, Inc. | 2010–present | | |
| White Diamonds Lustre • | Elizabeth Taylor | Actress | Elizabeth Arden, Inc. | 2014–present | | |
| White Diamonds Night • | Elizabeth Taylor | Actress | Elizabeth Arden, Inc. | 2016–present | | |
| Love & White Diamonds • | Elizabeth Taylor | Actress | Elizabeth Arden, Inc. | 2017–present | | |
| White Diamonds en Rouge • | Elizabeth Taylor | Actress | Elizabeth Arden, Inc. | 2019–present | | |
| White Diamonds Legacy • | Elizabeth Taylor | Actress | Elizabeth Arden, Inc. | 2021–present | | |
| Absolute Amethyst | Thalía | Singer | Thalía Sodi | 2019–present | | |
| Azure Crystal | Thalía | Singer | Thalía Sodi | 2019–present | | |
| Blooming Opal | Thalía | Singer | Thalía Sodi | 2019–present | | |
| Diamond Petals | Thalía | Singer | Thalía Sodi | 2019–present | | |
| Liquid Sun | Thalía | Singer | Thalía Sodi | 2019–present | | |
| Red For Filth | Alaska Thunderfuck | Singer; drag performer | | 2023–present | | |
| Tom of Finland • | Tom of Finland | Artist | Etat Libre d'Orange | 2007–present | | |
| Diamond Princess | Trina | Rapper; actress | | 2005–present | | |
| Diamond Doll | Trina | Rapper; actress | | | | |
| Donald Trump | Donald Trump | Reality TV personality; President of the United States | | 2004–present | | |
| Success | Donald Trump | Reality TV personality; President of the United States | | 2011–present | | |
| Empire | Donald Trump | Reality TV personality; President of the United States | | 2015–present | | |
| Ivanka Trump | Ivanka Trump | Reality TV personality; fashion designer; former political advisor | Parlux | 2012–present | | |
| Twiggy | Twiggy | Model | HSN | 2012–present | | |
| Twiggy Classic | Twiggy | Model | HSN | 2012–present | | |
| French Waltz | Tyler, the Creator | Rapper; fashion designer | Golf LeFleur | 2021–present | | |

== U ==
Key
| • | Denotes posthumous release |

List of scents / brands showing name, celebrity, occupation, label, production period, notes and references
| Scent / brand | Celebrity | Occupation(s) | Label | Prod. period | Notes | Ref. |
|---|---|---|---|---|---|---|
| Usher He | Usher | Singer; actor; television personality | Elizabeth Arden, Inc. | 2007–present | | |
| Usher She | Usher | Singer; actor; television personality | Elizabeth Arden, Inc. | 2007–present | | |
| UR fragrance duo: UR for Men; UR for Women | Usher | Singer; actor; television personality | Elizabeth Arden, Inc. | 2008–present | | |
| VIP | Usher | Singer; actor; television personality | Elizabeth Arden, Inc. | 2009–present | | |
| Femme by Usher | Usher | Singer; actor; television personality | Jacavi Beauty Group | 2018–present | | |
| Homme | Usher | Singer; actor; television personality | Jacavi Beauty Group | 2018–present | | |

== V ==
Key
| • | Denotes posthumous release |

List of scents / brands showing name, celebrity, occupation, label, production period, notes and references
| Scent / brand | Celebrity | Occupation(s) | Label | Prod. period | Notes | Ref. |
|---|---|---|---|---|---|---|
| Sofia | Sofia Vergara | Actress | Parlux | 2014–present | | |
| Love | Sofia Vergara | Actress | Parlux | 2015–present | | |
| Tempting | Sofia Vergara | Actress | Parlux | 2016–present | | |
| Tempting Paradise | Sofia Vergara | Actress | Parlux | 2017–present | | |
| Lost in Paradise | Sofia Vergara | Actress | Parlux | 2019–present | | |
| Saint | Kat Von D | Tattoo artist; reality television personality | Sephora | 2009–present | | |
| Sinner | Kat Von D | Tattoo artist; reality television personality | Sephora | 2009–present | | |
| Adora | Kat Von D | Tattoo artist; reality television personality | Sephora | 2010–present | | |
| Poetica | Kat Von D | Tattoo artist; reality television personality | Sephora | 2011–present | | |
| Saint (2017) | Kat Von D | Tattoo artist; reality television personality | KVD Vegan Beauty | 2017–present | | |
| Sinner (2017) | Kat Von D | Tattoo artist; reality television personality | KVD Vegan Beauty | 2017–present | | |
| Dita Von Teese | Dita Von Teese | Burlesque dancer | Luxess | 2011–present | | |
| Rouge | Dita Von Teese | Burlesque dancer | Luxess | 2012–present | | |
| Erotique | Dita Von Teese | Burlesque dancer | Luxess | 2013–present | | |
| FleurTeese | Dita Von Teese | Burlesque dancer | Luxess | 2013–present | | |
| Scandalwood | Dita Von Teese | Burlesque dancer | Heretic Parfum | 2017–present | | |

== W ==
Key
| • | Denotes posthumous release |

List of scents / brands showing name, celebrity, occupation, label, production period, notes and references
| Scent / brand | Celebrity | Occupation(s) | Label | Prod. period | Notes | Ref. |
|---|---|---|---|---|---|---|
| Boyfriend | Kate Walsh | Actress | HSN | 2010–present | | |
| Billionaire Boyfriend | Kate Walsh | Actress | HSN | 2012–present | | |
| Boyfriend (2018 edition) | Kate Walsh | Actress | Digital Media Management | 2018–present | | |
| Andy Warhol fragrance line • | Andy Warhol | Artist | Bond No. 9, Comme des Garçons, and Cofinluxe | 1999–present | Numerous, nearly two dozen scents between three companies. | |
| Shocking | Mae West | Actress | Maison Schiaparelli | 1932–199? | Bottle modeled after West's torso. | |
| Westbrook | Russell Westbrook | Basketball player | Byredo | 2015–201? | | |
| X | Westlife | Band | | 2009–present | | |
| With Love | Westlife | Band | | 2010–present | | |
| Scented by Willam | Willam | Actor; drag queen | Xyrena | 2017–2022 | | |
| Girl | Pharrell Williams | Producer; singer; entrepreneur | Comme des Garçons Parfum | 2014–2021 | | |
| Bruce Willis | Bruce Willis | Actor | LR Health & Beauty Systems | 2010–present | | |
| (Borrowed from) The Wild | Holly Willoughby | Media personality; author; model | Wylde Moon | 2022–present | | |
| R&C | Russell Wilson, Ciara | Football player, Singer | R&C Fragrance | 2020–present | Ciara was named after Revlon's Ciara, and previously served as a Revlon ambassador. | |
| R&C: Harmony | Russell Wilson, Ciara | Football player, Singer | R&C Fragrance | 2022–present | | |
| R&C: Intense | Russell Wilson, Ciara | Football player, Singer | R&C Fragrance | 2022–present | | |
| Expressions by Reese Witherspoon line: Live Without Regrets; Laugh Often; Love to the Fullest | Reese Witherspoon | Actress | Avon | 2011–present | | |
| Natalie • | Natalie Wood | Actress | Natalie Fragrances | 2015–present | | |
| With Love, Natalie • | Natalie Wood | Actress | Natalie Fragrances | 2015–present | | |
| La Rose • | Natalie Wood | Actress | Natalie Fragrances | 2015–present | | |

== X ==
Key
| • | Denotes posthumous release |

List of scents / brands showing name, celebrity, occupation, label, production period, notes and references
| Scent / brand | Celebrity | Occupation(s) | Label | Prod. period | Notes | Ref. |
|---|---|---|---|---|---|---|
| Rock & Love | Charli XCX | Musician | Impulse Fragrances | 2015–present | | |
| Vanilla Kisses | Charli XCX | Musician | Impulse Fragrances | 2015–present | | |
| Why Not | Charli XCX | Musician | Impulse Fragrances | 2016–present | | |

== Y ==
Key
| • | Denotes posthumous release |

List of scents / brands showing name, celebrity, occupation, label, production period, notes and references
| Scent / brand | Celebrity | Occupation(s) | Label | Prod. period | Notes | Ref. |
|---|---|---|---|---|---|---|
| Daddy Yankee | Daddy Yankee | Rapper; singer; songwriter | Falic Fashion Group | 2008–present | | |
| DYamante | Daddy Yankee | Rapper; singer; songwriter | Falic Fashion Group | 2010–present | | |
| Accident | Austin Young | Photographer; artist | Brent Leonesio | 2013–present | | |

== Z ==
Key
| • | Denotes posthumous release |

List of scents / brands showing name, celebrity, occupation, label, production period, notes and references
| Scent / brand | Celebrity | Occupation(s) | Label | Prod. period | Notes | Ref. |
|---|---|---|---|---|---|---|
| Empowered | Rachel Zoe | Celebrity stylist; fashion designer | Rachel Zoe | 2021–present | | |
| Fearless | Rachel Zoe | Celebrity stylist; fashion designer | Rachel Zoe | 2021–present | | |
| Instinct | Rachel Zoe | Celebrity stylist; fashion designer | Rachel Zoe | 2021–present | | |
| Warrior | Rachel Zoe | Celebrity stylist; fashion designer | Rachel Zoe | 2021–present | | |
