= Natural Wonder (disambiguation) =

Natural Wonder is an album by American musician Stevie Wonder.

Natural Wonder may also refer to:

- Seven Natural Wonders of the World, the natural counterparts to the Seven Wonders of the World
- Natural Wonder (Revlon subsidiary brand), a cosmetics brand from Revlon Consumer Products Corporation
