= Killian Wells =

American singer (born 1988)

- Born: November 13, 1988 (age 37)
- Occupations: Singer; Songwriter; Record Producer; Entrepreneur; Inventor; Perfumer; Photographer; Director; YouTube personality
- Years active: 2007–present
- Musical career
- Origin: New York City, New York, United States
- Genres: Pop; EDM
- Instrument: Vocals
- Label: Virgin Music Group • Inferno Records
- Website: killianwells.com

Killian Wells (born November 13, 1988) is a pop singer, songwriter, record producer, and entrepreneur from New York City.

Wells owns the record label Inferno Records, is the founder and head perfumer of Xyrena (a celebrity-branded perfume company), the CEO of Social Currency Ventures (an invite-only influencer affinity platform, management company, and branding agency), and the inventor of XUVO (a blacklight-reactive cocktail mixer).

In 2018 Wells started a YouTube channel covering a variety of topics and vlogs.

== Career ==
At age 17, Wells began co-producing his own material and formed the production team Sir Killian and Christof, a musical partnership. His first single to receive significant attention was "V.I.P.", released as a digital EP on July 21, 2009 on iTunes and Amazon MP3 through Wells' own indie label Inferno Records. "V.I.P." has received airplay on Top 40 stations and was added to US Airways in-flight entertainment Hit List channel in November 2009. Wells co-wrote and co-produced the album version of "V.I.P." The digital EP also features remixes by LorD and Master (who also remixed Dangerous Muse), Purple Moon Banana (RuPaul), and Wells under the moniker "Knightwriter".

The digital EP was replaced on May 25, 2010 by a new single mix of "V.I.P.", re-released to coincide with the debut of an accompanying music video by director Karl Giant which featured a cameo by Wells' friend Laverne Cox of Orange Is the New Black fame.

In Summer 2011 Wells' song "(If Only Life Could Be Like) Hollywood" was featured in Hollister and Claire's stores nationwide. Wells' co-wrote the song with Mark Calderon from Color Me Badd.

In 2011 Wells released "Psycho" along with a music video directed by Bec Stupak and co-starring Playboy Playmate of the Year Hope Dworaczyk as Wells' love interest.

In 2012 Wells' released "It's Like That" (feat. Nixon) with a 1950s stylized video featuring an appearance by popular YouTube star Glozell. The video featured a handful of product placements from brands including Big Red, Bosco, Kit-Cat, Brooklyn Industries, Bed Head, and Instagram shortly before it was purchased by Facebook.

Wells' "STRFKR", also released in 2012, co-starred gay porn actor Brent Everett and film actor and writer Michael Serrato. The music video was directed by Wells. Everett said he chose to be in the music video as he liked Wells' work and couldn't pass up a chance to work with him. The "STRFKR" video features some of the first adult product placements set to a mainstream song including Astroglide, ONE Condoms, and Manhunt.net. "STRFKR" became the opening title theme for Charlie David's 2013 documentary I'm A Porn Star,; the opening sequence also features clips from the "STRFKR" music video.

In 2013, Wells released "Remix My Love" featuring Kristinia DeBarge. The accompanying music video featured product placements from Pop Rocks, Shasta, Members Only, Numark, and South Beach Smoke. In the video both Killian and Kristinia are shown wearing authentic clothes and hairstyles from the 70's, 80's, 90's, 2000, and present day.

On September 18, 2015, Wells released the song "Flatline" which samples the 1980s hit "(I Just) Died in Your Arms" by Cutting Crew. The song was Wells' first release mastered for iTunes. A 1980s-inspired lyric video for the song was also released on Vevo

== Other work ==
In December 2008 Wells became part of photographer Adam Bouska's NOH8 Campaign in response to California Proposition 8 (2008) making him one of the first pop artists to join the campaign.

Wells was selected as one of 30 acts to perform in the music showcase Pure Pop 2009 at Webster Hall. The performance on November 14, 2009 was Wells' first live show. Jack Chambers (2008 season winner of So You Think You Can Dance Australia) appeared as one of Wells' dancers.

In 2014 it was revealed that Wells wrote, produced, and starred (anonymously in a 'mouse head') in a commercial spot for Beamz which caused Deadmau5 to hint at possible legal action. Wells produced the commercial (and coined the slogan "So Easy Even a Mouse Can Play It") as a result of a feud between Deadmau5 and Flo Rida (a spokesperson for Beamz). EDM artists including Zedd, Wolfgang Gartner, Steve Angello and Dirty South all commented about the spot on Twitter. In an article regarding deadmau5's trademark dispute with Disney, Complex Magazine quoted Killian as saying "The spot didn't imply an endorsement and the character could've easily been Mickey Mouse, Mighty Mouse, or Chuck E. Cheese. The front of the Deadmau5 head is unique, but to claim IP of a generic mouse silhouette is really grasping for straws."

== Personal life ==
From 2012 to 2013 it was rumored that Wells was dating adult film actor Tommy Defendi after the two made multiple public appearances together. In 2013 Wells also photographed Defendi for the TLA Gay holiday catalog cover.

In 2016 Wells revealed to The New York Post that in 2010 he'd been the target of a scammer posing as the nephew of Diane von Furstenberg and agent of Mariah Carey. “Once I started digging and spoke with some prominent entertainment attorneys, I found he was a fake,” Wells said of the incident.

== Other works ==
Wells art directed and photographed adult performers Tommy Defendi and Andy Taylor for the 2013 TLA Gay holiday catalog cover.

== Discography ==
=== Extended plays ===
Year	Album
2009	V.I.P.: Released: July 21, 2009; Discontinued: April 2010; Formats: digital download

=== Singles ===
- 2010: "V.I.P."
- 2011: "Psycho"
- 2012: "It's Like That" (feat. Nixon)
- 2012: "STRFKR"
- 2013: "Remix My Love" (feat. Kristinia DeBarge)
- 2015: "Flatline"
- 2017: "Blue Dream"

== Awards ==
=== Art & Olfaction Awards ===
- 2016 (3rd Annual): Finalist - Perfumer of Xyrena's Dark Ride in the Best Independent Fragrance Category

=== Taste Awards ===
- 2018 (9th Annual): Winner (Special Achievement Honoree) - Hollywood Tastemakers Award
- 2018 (9th Annual): Finalist - Ferrara Flame Award for Best Branded Content for Killian Wells "Blue Dream" Music Video (Presented by Xyrena)
- 2016 (7th Annual): Winner - Director of Viewers Choice Best Mini Film or Documentary "Flazéda by Pearl" for Xyrena
- 2016 (7th Annual): Finalist - Director of Best Fashion Film "Flazéda by Pearl" for Xyrena
- 2016 (7th Annual): Finalist - Ferrara Flame Award for Best Branded Video Promotion or Campaign "Flazéda by Pearl" for Xyrena

=== OUTMusic Awards ===
- 2010: Nominated - OUTStanding Dance Song ("V.I.P.")
- 2010: Nominated - NEXT Generation Talent Search Contest - OUTStanding Original Song ("V.I.P.")

=== Independent Music Awards ===
- 2008 (7th Annual): Nominated - Best Website Design for an Indie Label (Inferno Records)
