= Xyrena =

American perfumery

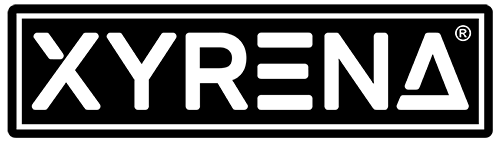
- Industry: Beauty
- Founded: 2015; 11 years ago in Los Angeles, California
- Founder: Killian Wells
- Headquarters: Austin, Texas, United States
- Area served: Worldwide
- Products: Cosmetics; Candles; Fragrances; Celebrity perfumes
- Website: www.xyrena.com

Xyrena is an Austin, Texas perfumery founded in Los Angeles specializing in cruelty-free and vegan products certified by PETA and Leaping Bunny. Xyrena describes itself as "a defiant cosmetics startup that includes the world's first celebrity-partnered on-demand perfumery". Xyrena only releases fragrances in water-free Extrait de Parfum form.

== History ==
Founder Killian Wells coined the name "Xyrena" as a compound of two terms: XY for male and female chromosomes (echoed by the brand's unisex fragrances and cosmetics) and RENA, from the Latin word renascor, which means "to be renewed or reborn." The name Xyrena also means "enchanter" in Old Greek.

== Notable fragrances ==
Aaliyah by Xyrena: A tribute fragrance to the late singer known as the "Princess of R&B". Launched for pre-order on September 15, 2015, Aaliyah by Xyrena was developed in collaboration with Aaliyah's brother Rashad Haughton & mother Diane Haughton. Missy Elliott supported the fragrance with a tweet. 5% of the proceeds from Aaliyah by Xyrena will be donated to the Aaliyah Memorial Fund. An official web spot, directed by Killian Wells and Christopher Oroza was released for the fragrance. On September 30, 2015 one thousand samples of the fragrance were gifted to attendees of PETA's 35th Anniversary Party with Paul McCartney.

Flazéda by Pearl: Created by Xyrena in collaboration with Pearl, Flazéda is the first commercial fragrance to be released by an alumnus of RuPaul's Drag Race An official fashion film titled #LoveYourself was released to support the fragrance; directed by Killian Wells and Christopher Oroza, the high-fashion short (featuring a soundtrack reminiscent of Amy Winehouse) was compared to branding by Vogue and Calvin Klein

Formula 3 by Dalton Maldonado: Formula 3 is the first signature fragrance from an openly gay athlete. Part of the proceeds from Formula 3 go to support the LGBT sports organization You Can Play. Professional athletes and celebrities have shown their support of the product on Twitter including Michael Sam, Wade Davis, Jason Collins, and Montel Williams.
