= David Beckham Homme =

Perfume by David Beckham

Fragrance by David Beckham
- Top notes: Citrus; ginger; pine; pepper
- Heart notes: Cashmere wood; leather; rosemary
- Base notes: Mahogany wood; patchouli; skin musk
- Released: September 2011
- Label: Coty
- Tagline: The new fragrance
- Flanker(s): Urban Homme by David Beckham
- Predecessor: Intimately Beckham
- Successor: The Essence

David Beckham Homme is a men's eau de toilette fragrance endorsed by English footballer David Beckham. The scent, which was released by Coty in September 2011, joined his existing scents David Beckham Instinct (2005) and Intimately Beckham (2006), a his-and-hers collection with his wife Victoria Beckham. The fragrance was launched as part of a new branding venture with business partner Simon Fuller, which also included a men's bodywear line and a number of other projects to capitalize on Beckham's worldwide commercial appeal.

== Conception ==
It was announced on 19 May 2011 that David Beckham and his business partner, Simon Fuller, would be launching a men's bodywear line, a men's fragrance (with licensing partner Coty), and a number of other projects to capitalize on Beckham's worldwide commercial appeal. The fragrance, entitled David Beckham Homme, would join existing scents David Beckham Instinct (2005) and Intimately Beckham (2006), a his-and-hers collection with his wife Victoria Beckham.

A new logo was created for all of Beckham's commercial ventures in order to create a "uniform visual identity" for the brand. The mark, which was created by Alasdhair Willis, features the David Beckham name in the Replica Pro font, with a circular hole "punched out of the script". The hole represents a football and a lens or viewfinder. Willis stated that the major challenge when creating the brand identity for Beckham was: "How do you convey through a brand mark the sheer diversity of the David Beckham world?".

== Development ==
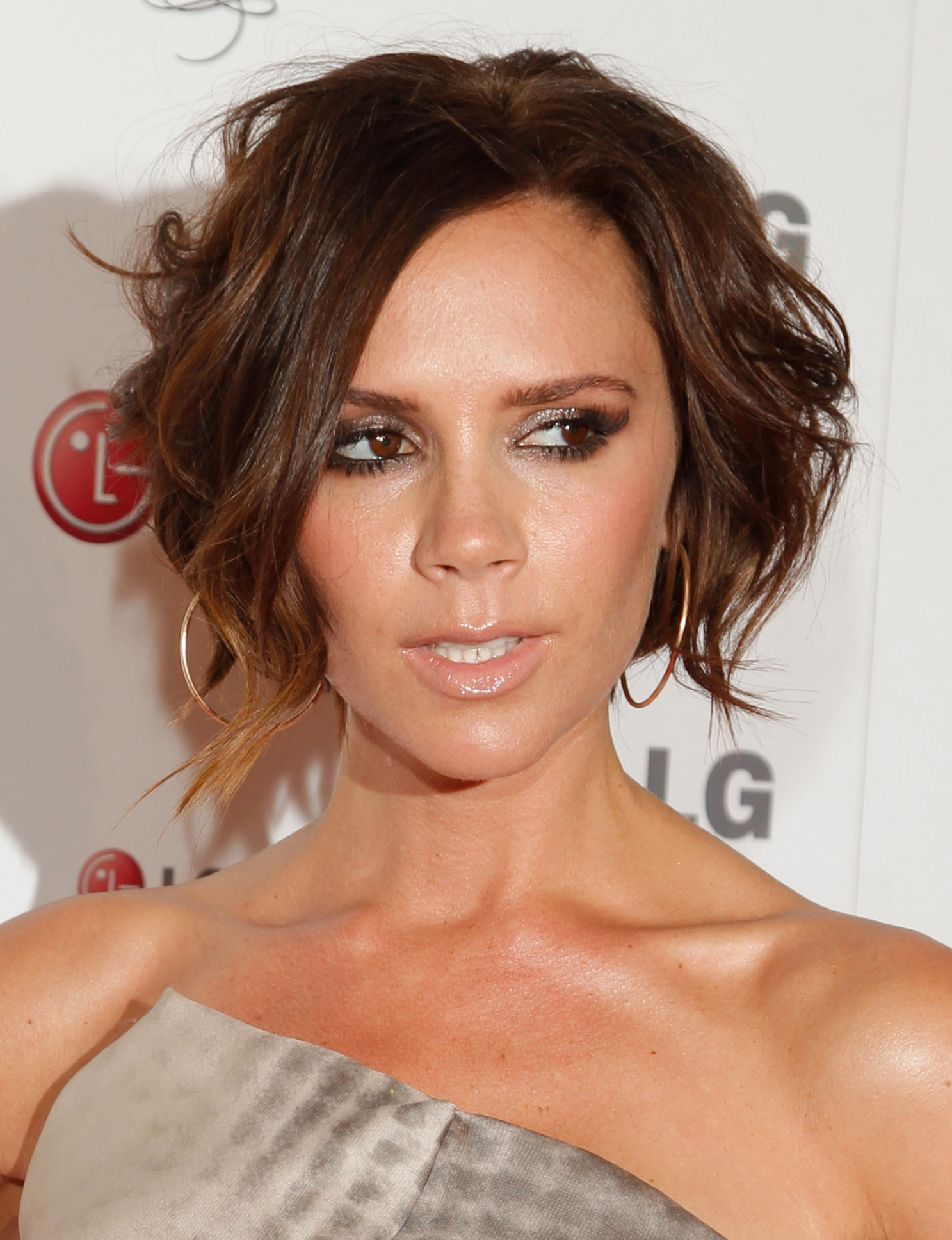
David designed the scent with Victoria's preferences in mind.

Beckham designed the scent with Victoria's preferences in mind, as the scent is something that she has to "put up with" being on him. He tested the fragrance out on his three sons, stating that: "That's the good thing about having three boys, they are so honest".

David Beckham Homme is based on wooden and spicy notes. Beckham has cited rosewood, pink grapefruit and pepper as being three of his favourite scents. According to Beckham, the scents "gives it a kind of leather, cashmere, woody feel"; something that he has liked in the scents he has worn "over the years".

== Marketing and reception ==
The print campaign for David Beckham Homme was shot by fashion photographer Alasdair McLellan in March 2011. The photographs feature Beckham against a dark background, wearing a sleek charcoal gray suit. According to Erin Donnelly of Fashion Etc., the styling gives Don Draper "a run for his money". A behind-the-scenes video of the photo shoot was released in on 19 July by British GQ. In the video, he discusses the inspiration behind the scent, poses in a suit and "runs around with his shirt off".

The television advert for David Beckham Homme was directed by Anthony Mandler. Beckham appeared in a sketch on The Ellen DeGeneres Show to promote the fragrance. In the sketch he is "almost unrecognisable" as he stood in the cosmetics aisle at a Target store, offering passing customers a sample spray of the scent. David Beckham Homme was included in Esquire's list of the best colognes for men in 2011. Digital Spy included the fragrance in their 2012 Christmas gift guide, commenting that: "The man in your life may not look like Mr Beckham – but at least he can smell like him".

== See also ==
- List of celebrity-branded fragrances
