= Laurice Rahmé =

French-born businesswoman and entrepreneur

- Born: Paris, France
- Occupations: Businesswoman and entrepreneur
- Known for: Founder and president, Bond No. 9 New York Fragrances

Laurice Rahmé is a French-born businesswoman and entrepreneur. She is the founder and president of Bond No. 9 New York Fragrances.

== Early years ==
Rahmé was born and educated in Paris, France.

She began her professional life as an antiques dealer in Paris. She opened her own shop in Les Halles, on the corner of the Rue Saint-Denis and Rue de la Cossonnerie.

== Career ==
In 1973, Rahmé joined Lancôme as International Training Director, tripling the company's skincare business in the Middle East. In 1976, she assumed the role of Director of the Lancome Institut de Beauté, and relocated to L'Oréal USA's (then Cosmair, Inc.) headquarters in New York, NY, US.

From 1989 to 1995, Rahmé was responsible for introducing the small French company to the US.

Following her work with Annick Goutal, Rahmé became US distributor of Creed fragrances in 1995.

== Bond No. 9 ==
In 2003, Laurice Rahmé launched her own fragrance company, Bond No. 9.

In 2011, Rahmé launched the "I LOVE NY" by Bond No. 9 collection. It is a smaller collection of fragrances produced in partnership with the State of New York. The perfume bottles bear the "I Love NY" logo designed by Milton Glaser.

== Personal life ==
Laurice Rahmé currently lives in New York City.

== Legal Issues ==
Two former employees filed a federal suit against Rahmé in 2012 for claims of racism against customers and employees. Rahmé allegedly used a secret code to alert security of when African-American customers entered the store. Rahmé admitted that the code "We need the light bulbs changed" was used to alert security of suspicious individuals, irrespective of race, but also stated that all robberies up to that point were committed by African Americans. The litigants withdrew the suit two years later without retracting their claims, stating that the suit had become too time-consuming and expensive.

== Awards and distinctions ==
Rahmé has sat on the board of directors for the Fragrance Foundation, and was named "Business Woman of the Year" by the Foundation's Business Advisory Council Committee.

In January 2006, she was given the "Beauty/Fragrance Entrepreneur Rising Star Award" at the 9th annual Rising Star Awards, sponsored by Fashion Group International (FGI).

In November 2012, Rahmé received the Cosmetic Executive Women (CEW) "Innovator of the Year" award.
