= Believe (fragrance) =

Perfume endorsed by Britney Spears

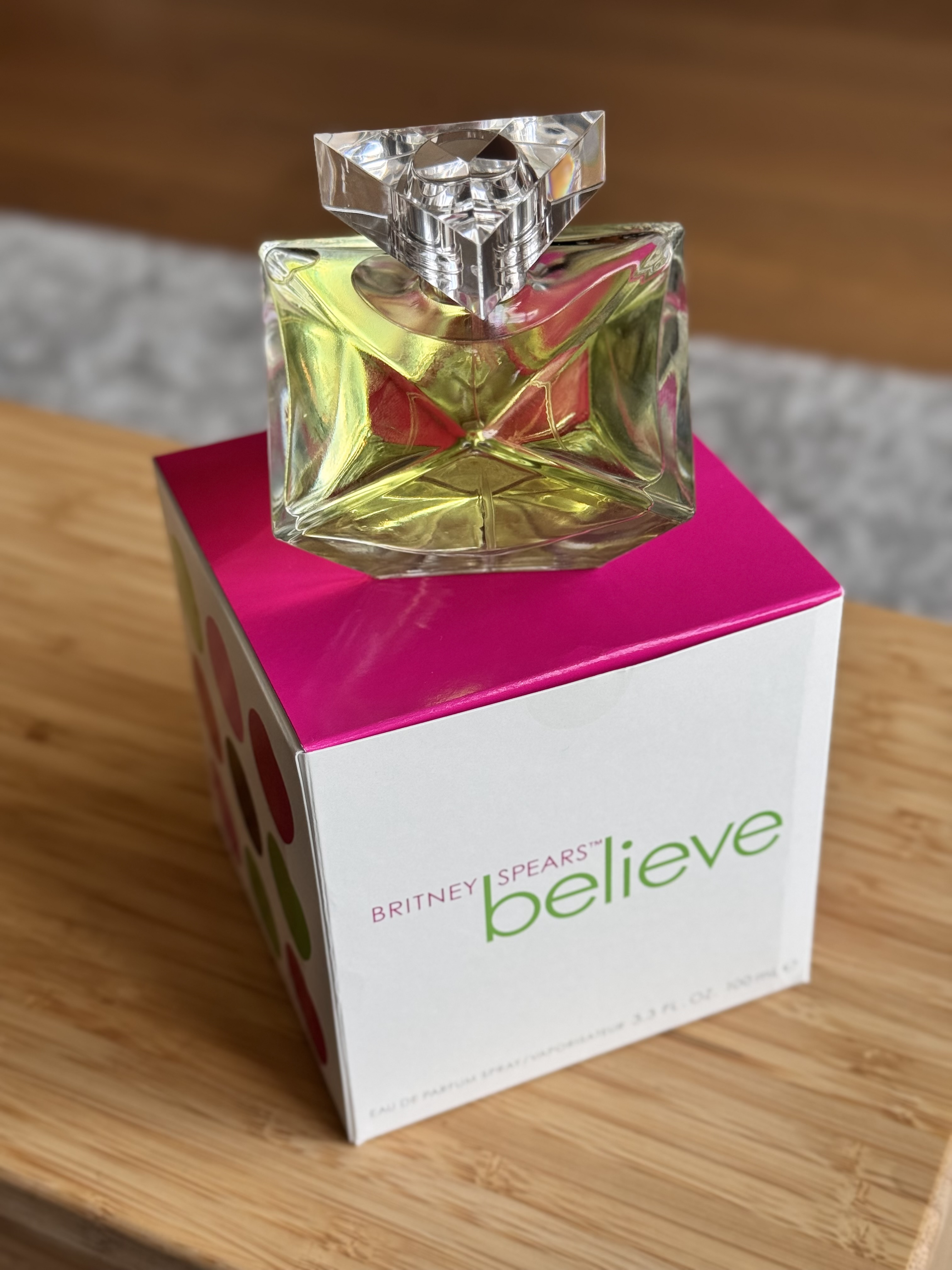

Fragrance by Britney Spears
- Released: October, 2007
- Label: Elizabeth Arden
- Tagline: The Greatest Freedom is to Believe in Yourself
- Successor: Radiance

Believe is a women's fragrance by American singer Britney Spears, released in October 2007 in collaboration with Elizabeth Arden. Created by Loc Dong and Carlos Benaïm, it was the fifth fragrance released under Spears' fragrance line.

== Background and Release ==
After her first two lines of fragrances, Curious and Fantasy and their flankers Curious: In Control and Midnight Fantasy, Believe became Spears’ third line of perfumes and fifth fragrance release overall. Elizabeth Arden announced Believe in August 2007, ahead of its scheduled October release. At the time, the company reported that Spears' fragrance line had sold more than 10 million bottles worldwide.

The fragrance was distributed to approximately 1,800 department stores in the United States, including Macy's, and was also made available through its official website. Elizabeth Arden planned an international rollout beginning in January 2008. Although the company did not disclose sales projections or advertising expenditures, industry estimates projected at least $10 million in U.S. retail sales during the fragrance's first year.

The advertising campaign was photographed by Michael Thompson in Santa Monica, California and featured Spears posed against a backdrop of white birdcages. Advertisements appeared in fashion, beauty, and lifestyle magazines beginning in October 2007. In a 2009 company report, Elizabeth Arden stated that Believe had sold more than one million bottles during its first year on the market.

The fragrance also appeared in Spears' music videos for Circus (2008) and Radar (2009). In Circus, the bottle is shown on Spears' dressing-table during the opening backstage sequence, while in Radar it appears briefly near the end of the video.

== Scent and packaging ==
Believe is classified as a floral amber gourmand fragrance. Created by Loc Dong and Carlos Benaïm, it features top notes of guava and tangerine, middle notes of linden blossom and honeysuckle, and base notes of patchouli, amber, and praline. The fragrance is presented in a pale green, faceted triangular glass bottle with a silver plate bearing Spears' signature. The folding carton opens to reveal the bottle and features magenta and metallic accents on the interior. The exterior is white with metallic dots in shades of pink, magenta, and green.

== Reception ==
Reviews of Believe described the fragrance as less sweet and more mature than Spears' earlier releases, noting the prominence of patchouli alongside fruity notes such as guava and tangerine. Some reviewers also described the composition as suitable for both women and men because of its balance of earthy and fruit accords. The bottle design also received positive commentary. Reviewers compared its faceted triangular shape with the packaging of Spears' earlier fragrances, Curious and Fantasy, and described it as more understated in design.
