= Radiance (fragrance) =

Perfume endorsed by Britney Spears

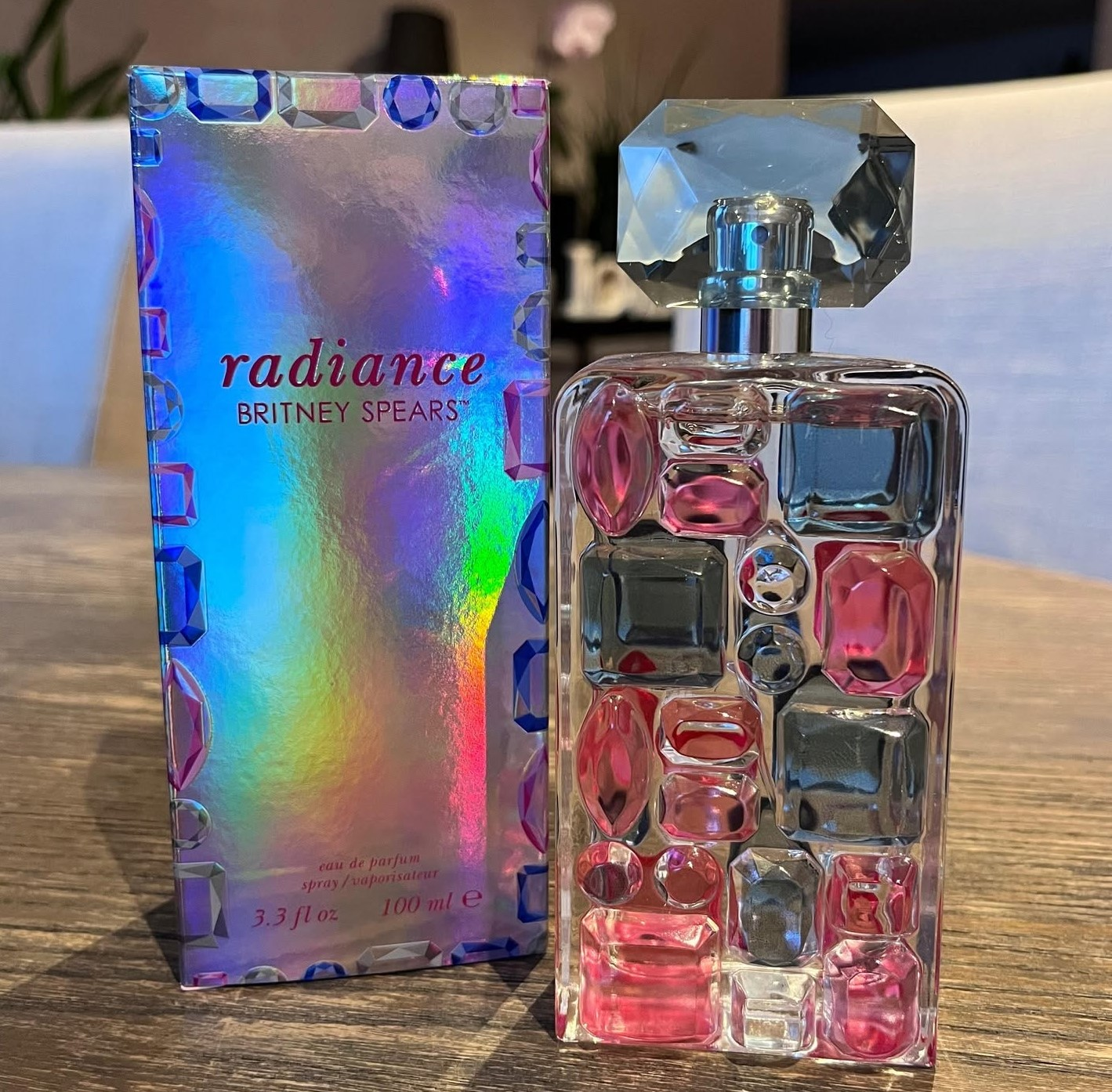

Fragrance by Britney Spears
- Released: September, 2010
- Label: Elizabeth Arden
- Tagline: Choose Your Own Destiny
- Successor: Private Show

Radiance is a women’s fragrance by American singer Britney Spears released in September 2010 through a collaboration with Elizabeth Arden. Created by Honorine Blanc and Harry Fremont, the floral-fruity eau de parfum is the ninth addition to Spears' fragrances.

== Background and Release ==
Radiance was the fourth fragrance line released by Britney Spears and the ninth fragrance in her line overall, following Curious, Fantasy and Believe, and five flankers from the first two lines. In its 2009 annual report, Elizabeth Arden announced plans to release the fragrance in fall 2010. In July 2010, Spears posted the first campaign image for Radiance on her Twitter account with the caption: “Just got the imaging for my new fragrance Radiance… thought I’d share it with all my tweethearts.”. The advertisement showed Spears wearing a backless dress alongside the fragrance bottle, which was decorated with pink, blue, and clear accents. The campaign used the tagline "Choose Your Own Destiny".

In a press release for Radiance, Elizabeth Arden executive Ronald Rolleston described Spears' fragrance business as successful in both the United States and international markets. In the same press release, Spears talked about the fragrance by adding "I love the feminine scent of my new perfume Radiance, it has the power to make any woman feel beautiful". Honorine Blanc and Harry Fremont created Radiance for Elizabeth Arden. According to the company, the perfumers developed the fragrance with elements of Spears' personality and image in mind.

== Scent and Packaging ==
Radiance was created by perfumers Honorine Blanc and Harry Fremont. It is a floral fragrance with top notes of wild berries and petals, followed by tuberose, jasmine, orange blossom, and iris. The base notes include cashmere wood, amber, and musk. The fragrance is presented in a rectangular, faceted glass bottle decorated with faux gemstones in pink, blue, and translucent white. The name Radiance is printed on one side of the bottle. The gemstone design is also used on the holographic outer carton, which features a crystal pattern and the fragrance name on the front.

== Marketing ==
Radiance received exposure through Spears’ music career. The fragrance made visual appearances in the music videos for Hold It Against Me and Criminal, both in 2011. In Hold It Against Me, the bottle is featured among a series of branded product placements into the futuristic and high-energy setting of the video. In Criminal, Radiance appears in the opening scene of the music video along with her fragrance Fantasy.

=== TV Commercial ===
The commercial for the fragrance premiered on Spears' Youtube Channel and her Facebook page on August 29, 2010. The next day, Spears shared the commercial on her Twitter account saying: "Aloha! Here's my new commercial for Radiance...do you like? -Brit." The commercial features Spears entering a fortune teller’s parlor. She is shown sitting at a table as the fortune teller asks Spears if she wants to know about her future. Spears refuses to listen and walks away from the place saying she chooses her own destiny. The commercial concludes with a close-up of the Radiance perfume bottle and Spears saying its tagline.

== Reception ==
Reviews of Radiance discussed both the fragrance and its packaging. Some reviewers compared the scent to other floral fragrances of the period, including Viva La Juicy by Juicy Couture. The fragrance was described as a musky white floral with fruity notes, with some reviews noting its familiar and accessible scent profile. Other reviewers considered it suitable for casual wear or as a gift.

Some reviews noted the fragrance's longevity and recommended it as an evening fragrance. Reviews differed in their assessment of its overall quality. Some described it as a mainstream fragrance, while others considered it one of the stronger fragrances in Spears' collection. One publication described it as "the best yet" and compared it with designer fragrances.

The bottle also received attention for its design. The rectangular flacon was described as "Vegas-y" and decorative. The outer carton used holographic foil and diffractive printing across its surface, which increased the packaging's visibility at points of sale. One analysis described the effect as creating an impression of "inner radiance." Design analysts identified the packaging's visual appeal, its connection to the fragrance's branding, and its suggestion that the wearer would stand out as factors contributing to its effectiveness.

Elizabeth Arden reported in its 2012 annual report that net sales increased by 6.5%, or $71.7 million, for the fiscal year ending June 30, 2011, compared with the previous year. The company attributed $37.5 million of the increase to licensed and other owned fragrance products, with the performance of several brands contributing to the result. The company also cited the launch of Radiance among the factors supporting fragrance sales.

== Accolades ==
Year	Award	Category	Ref.
2012	PPC Awards	Excellence Award - Cosmetics	
