= Black Phoenix Alchemy Lab =

Perfume retailer

- Type: Online retailer
- Industry: Perfume
- Founders: Elizabeth Moriarty Barrial, Brian Constantine
- Headquarters: Philadelphia, Pennsylvania, United States
- Area served: Worldwide
- Products: Indie perfumes
- Owner: Elizabeth Moriarty Barrial, Brian Constantine
- Website: blackphoenixalchemylab.com

Black Phoenix Alchemy Lab, also known as BPAL, is an online retailer of indie perfumes and related products. It is owned by perfumers Elizabeth Moriarty Barrial, Brian Constantine and is based in Philadelphia. It was established in 2000 and began selling online through their website in 2002.

== Company Products ==
Primarily a producer of hand-blended, small batch fragrance oils, typically called perfume oils, Black Phoenix Alchemy Lab also produces hair conditioning spray, lotion, and air freshener. Distinct from typical aerosolized perfumes or perfume suspended in an ethanol-and-water mixture, which is then sprayed, perfume oils involve a higher concentration of perfume to solvent and typically use a coconut or jojoba oil. These perfume oils are applied directly upon the skin.

One of the earliest independent fragrance brands, established online in 2002 with a once a month pop-up retail location in Burbank, California (now defunct), BPAL advertises itself as part of goth and geek subcultural. They maintain all of their products are vegan aside from those based on honey and do not test on animals.

=== Marketing and Advertising ===
BPAL perfumes come in either 5ml glass bottles or 0.75ml glass vials, the latter of which can be purchased in sample packs. A significant part of their advertising push is done through their yearly seasonal releases based on their Anniversary, Lupercalia, Shunga, Halloween, and Yule; their monthly full moon-themed A Little Lunacy; and various artistic work inspired releases. The latter include both licensed product collaborations and artworks which have fallen into public domain. Limited releases are produced in single batches and sold until they run out; the lab does not provide samples of these scents, unlike the general catalog, leading to an active reviewing, decanting, and resale market.

=== Related Companies ===
The creators behind BPAL also release small runs of personal products, such as soaps, nail polishes, and apparel, through their sister company Black Phoenix Trading Post, as well as perfume oils inspired by modern paganism through Twilight Alchemy Lab.

== Influences and inspirations ==
Black Phoenix Alchemy Lab's perfumes are often inspired by works of art, mythology, folk superstitions, voodoo, classical literature, historical figures, pirates, and carnivals. Themes include aromatherapy, locations both real and fictional, devilish garden plantings, role playing games, fairy tales, vampire lore, gothic and pagan themes, Lovecraftian mythos, Japanese "Shunga" artwork and deities and concepts from various pantheons.

Black Phoenix Alchemy Lab has also worked with and licensed the rights to create products based on media such as Guillermo del Toro's film, Crimson Peak., Pretty Deadly, Only Lovers Left Alive, Sherlock Holmes, Fraggle Rock, Labyrinth, Paranorman, The Last Unicorn, Hellboy, Witchblade, David Mack's Kabuki, and Neil Gaiman's books.

The company also has a significant Activism line centering around events such as natural disasters, voter's rights, the 2020 protests against the murder of George Floyd, the overturn of Roe V Wade, the separation of migrant children at the border, and other causes considered progressive in the United States. Proceeds from these lines go to charities like the ACLU, NAACP, World Kitchen Fund, etc.
