= Shakira Perfumes =

Perfume line by Shakira and Puig

- Formerly: Shakira Beauty
- Type: Sociedad Anónima (S.A.)
- Industry: Perfume
- Founded: 2008; 18 years ago
- Founder: Shakira
- Area served: Worldwide
- Key people: Shakira (Creative Leader); Marion Costero (Perfumer); Sonia Constant (Perfumer); Olivier Cresp (Perfumer); Fanny Bal (Perfumer); Sophie Labbe (Perfumer); Elisabeth Vidal (Perfumer)
- Owner: Puig
- Website: www.shakiraperfumes.com

Shakira Perfumes (formerly: Shakira Beauty) is a perfume line by Colombian singer-songwriter Shakira in collaboration with Spanish perfume company Puig. Launched in 2010, the collaboration has expanded over the years to include a wide variety of perfumes, each designed to capture different aspects of Shakira's personality and artistic journey. In addition to featuring around 50 fragrances, the line also features deodorants and lotions.

== History ==
=== 2008–2009: Amuleto ===
Shakira announced the release of what would have been her first perfume, named Amuleto, in 2009. The fragrance is a mix of Latin and Arabic influences. It features notes of sandalwood, jasmine and vanilla. The red and gold perfume bottle is inspired by Shakira's own silhouette and includes a wearable charm wrapped around it. However, the perfume was never released.

=== 2010–2019 ===
The first fragrance, S by Shakira, was introduced in 2010. It combines simplicity and femininity to reflect Shakira's personal style and essence. Various flanker fragrances have been released to the S by Shakira collection, including S by Shakira Eau Florale, S by Shakira Aquamarine, and S Kiss.

The perfume line evolved alongside Shakira's career, with new fragrances introduced to reflect her growth as an artist. Elixir, launched in 2012, is designed to stand out from her earlier perfumes by featuring an exotic and sensual aroma, which she describes as a "second skin" that integrates with the wearer. The Elixir collection features also flanker fragrances, such as Wild Elixir.

Rock!, a fragrance that "represents the expression of Shakira's most daring side and pays tribute to the music that moves the world", was launched in 2014 in an electric guitar shaped bottle. The Rock! perfume collection includes also various flanker fragrances such as Love Rock!.

Dance fragrance was launched in 2016, in a bottle that simulates Shakira's curves, rhythm and movement. Flanker fragrances of the Dance collection include Dance Ocean and Dance Stellar among others. Other perfumes of the collection include the Dance Midnight line, which consists of Dance Midnight, Dance Red Midnight, and Dance Star Midnight among others.

In 2018, Shakira launched Dream. It launched alongside a biographical web series named Shakira Dream, where she would share her life experiences and talk about her journey to stardom. The Dream collection includes various flanker perfumes such as Sweet Dream.

=== 2020–present ===
During the COVID-19 pandemic in 2020, Shakira announced that Puig temporarily shifted its production focus in response to global health needs converting its perfume factories to produce hand sanitizer. The sanitizer was donated to the Spanish government to help combat the spread of the virus.

In 2021, Shakira celebrated her perfume line's 10 year anniversary with the launch of Dance Red Midnight, a fragrance described as the brand's "most hypnotic and sensual" offering. The perfume's packaging features a striking red bottle, symbolizing a blend of elegance and boldness, and was marketed as a continuation of Shakira's artistic expression through scent. In the same year, Shaki Mini Collection was launched, featuring seven different perfumes in 30 ml bottles.

In late 2023, Shakira launched Rojo, her first Eau de Parfum, and the first launch of Shakira Collection, or SHK Collection, which features perfumes named after colors. Shakira explained how red (Spanish: rojo) is a strong color that symbolizes passion, strength, and empowerment. Rojo offers a scent that gradually develops through multiple layers, serving as a reflection of Shakira herself. It features initial scents of raspberry, black currant, and lemon; middle notes of ylang-ylang, cardamom, ginger, narcissus, and pink pepper; and concluding notes of sun, ambergris, and cedar. In the promotional video for the parfum, Shakira appears dressed fully in red in front of a red background, while her song with Black Eyed Peas, "Girl Like Me", is playing.

In early 2025, Amarillo was released. The fragrance features a blend of bergamot, coconut, and pineapple at its top notes. Its core comprises a floral bouquet of jasmine, lily of the valley, and a solar accord, adding brightness and a sense of femininity. The base notes include vanilla, sandalwood, and a hint of musk. The bottle is designed in a sunny yellow color, with a curved and refined shape, embossed with Shakira's name and topped with a gold cap, evoking the imagery of sunlight and energy.

== List of perfumes ==
List of Shakira Perfumes
Release year	Perfume Name	Collection
2010	S by Shakira	S by Shakira
2011	S by Shakira Eau Florale	S by Shakira
2012	Elixir	Elixir
2013	S by Shakira Aquamarine	S by Shakira
2013	Wild Elixir	Elixir
2014	Aphrodisiac Elixir	Elixir
2014	Rock! by Shakira	Rock!
2015	Paradise Elixir	Elixir
2015	Love Rock! by Shakira	Rock!
2015	S Eau Florale Deluxe Edition	S by Shakira
2015	S Deluxe Edition	S by Shakira
2016	Rock! Deluxe Edition	Rock!
2016	Pop Rock!	Rock!
2016	Summer Rock! Sweet Candy	Rock!
2016	Summer Rock! Fruity Vibes	Rock!
2016	Magnetic Elixir	Elixir
2016	Dance	Dance
2016	S Eau Florale Sparkling Love	S by Shakira
2016	S Eau Florale Sparkling Stars	S by Shakira
2017	Rock! The Party Daring Pink	Rock!
2017	Rock! The Party Crazy Lilac	Rock!
2017	S Kiss	S by Shakira
2017	Love Rock! Deluxe Edition	Rock!
2017	I Am Rock!	Rock!
2017	Dance Diamonds	Dance
2018	Miss S	S by Shakira
2018	Rock! the Night for Men	Rock!
2018	Rock! the Night	Rock!
2018	Dance Alegría	Dance
2018	Dream	Dream
2019	We Rock! for Her	Rock!
2019	We Rock! for Him	Rock!
2019	S Smile	S by Shakira
2019	Dance Moonlight	Dance
2019	Dance Magnetic	Dance
2019	Sweet Dream	Dream
2020	S Sugar	S by Shakira
2020	Animal Rock!	Rock!
2020	Dance Midnight	Dance
2020	Golden Dream	Dream
2021	Dance Red Midnight	Dance
2021	Dance Pop Edition	Dance
2022	Dance My Floral Edition	Dance
2022	Dance Midnight Muse	Dance
2023	Dance Ocean	Dance
2023	Rojo	SHK
2024	Fucsia	SHK
2024	Dance Star Midnight	Dance
2024	S Blush Kiss	S by Shakira
2025	Amarillo	SHK
2025	Dance Stellar	Dance
2025	S Kiss Honey	S by Shakira
2026	Rojo Elixir	SHK
2026	Fucsia Elixir	SHK
2026	S Sugar Kiss	S by Shakira

=== Shaki Mini Collection ===
- Shaki Mini Collection: Dance 2021
- Shaki Mini Collection: Dance Diamonds 2021
- Shaki Mini Collection: Dance Midnight 2021
- Shaki Mini Collection: Dance Red Midnight 2021
- Shaki Mini Collection: Rock! 2021
- Shaki Mini Collection: Dream 2021
- Shaki Mini Collection: Sweet Dream 2021

=== Unlaunched perfumes ===
- Amuleto 2009
