= Natural Wonder (Revlon subsidiary brand) =

Defunct cosmetic brand

Natural Wonder Cosmetics
- Product type: Cosmetics
- Current owner: CVC Capital Partners
- Country: New York, NY, United States
- Introduced: 1963
- Discontinued: 2000
- Markets: world
- Previous owners: Revlon Cons. Prod. Corp.

Natural Wonder Cosmetics, the United States cosmetics brand, was operated by Revlon Consumer Products Corporation from 1963 to 2000, when Revlon sold the division to CVC Capital Partners. One of the first products to use the brand was a medicated foundation. Natural Wonder provided Revlon with an economy cosmetics brand throughout the 1980s and 1990s.

One of the more prominent spokeswomen for Natural Wonder was Debbie Gibson, who advertised the company's products to her teenager demographic during 1988–1990 and even designed a celebrity scent that the company marketed in 1989 (for further info on Electric Youth by Debbie Gibson see Electric Youth (fragrance)).

Among standard products were the following:

- Super Nails, including standard nail enamels and a transparent 3-Way Nail Hardener.
- Finer Liner eyeliner.
