= Dalton Maldonado =

American basketball player

Personal information
- Nationality: American
- Citizenship: United States of America
- Born: October 20, 1995 (age 31) Pikeville, Kentucky
- Education: Student at University of Louisville, Roger Williams School of Law (Dec 2022)
- Height: 5 ft 11 in (180 cm)
- Weight: 165 lb (75 kg; 11 st 11 lb)
- Website: www.facebook.com/SupportDaltonMaldonado1/

Sport
- Sport: Basketball
- Position: Point Guard
- Person of the Year: 2015

Dalton Maldonado (born October 20, 1995) is an American former high school basketball player and LGBT rights activist who came to national prominence when he shared the harrowing tale of intimidation when he came out at a high school basketball game in Kentucky.

In 2015, Maldonado was featured as one of the most influential people in the LGBT community by Out magazine and he was named "Person of the Year" by Outsports.

== Early life and education ==
Maldonado was born in Pikeville, Kentucky, in 1995 and attended Betsy Layne High School.

=== Coming out experience ===
He became known after coming out after a basketball game. His coming out gained national attention after being featured in Outsports magazine. Maldonado wants to make sure no other teen endures the harassment he received after coming out, saying in a Facebook post, “To the kid who isn’t out and who is reading this ... it’s going to get better. You’ll see that it’s not as scary as you think, and the people who truly love you will stick by your side, and that’s the people you truly need in your life. To the parents who have a gay son or daughter, accept them. You don’t know what they might already be facing.”

Maldonado's coming out occurred at a high school basketball game in Lexington, Kentucky, on December 28, 2014. He was playing in a tournament with his Betsy Layne High School team, who lost the game to Bryan Station High School. During the post-game handshake, a member of the opposing team called Maldonado an anti-gay slur. He shoots back with, “Yeah baby. Can I have your number?”. Soon after, he retreated to the locker room and began to break down. He had only come out to a friend on the team and his parents earlier that week - the latter not being supportive of his sexuality. When his team caught up to him, they began asking questions relating to the incident. Maldonado then decided to come out to his supportive teammates. The opposing team followed suit as they all walked back to their bus. When they made it on the bus, the Bryan Station students began banging on the nearest window, shouting gay slurs at the team. Some students tried to board the bus but were stopped by Maldonado, his coach, and the bus driver. When the Betsy Layne students drove off, the opposing team members got into their cars and followed the bus, making threatening gestures at the students. The coach contacted the police after seeing the gestures, and cops were waiting at the hotel when they arrived. Maldonado decided to continue playing in the tournament regardless. He and his teammates had police escorts to and from the games and were only allowed on a specific hotel floor.

Following reports that he had been harassed because of his sexuality by the rival team from Bryan Station High School, both schools were challenged in the press. Both schools said that they had conducted internal investigations and denied any wrongdoing. The Fayette County public schools administration's investigation concluded that the event "was inaccurately reported and mischaracterized" by the media.

=== Aftermath ===
After coming out, Maldonado's picture was left out of the two-page spread commemorating his basketball team in his senior yearbook. In addition to the team photo, there were individual call-outs for every team member except Maldonado. His school, Betsy Layne High School, claimed that the omission was accidental and that the school district "holistically supports Dalton Maldonado just as we do all our students." They point out that the book includes 15 photos of Maldonado, including many that show him playing basketball.

== Later life ==
In 2015, Maldonado was attending college at the University of Louisville, where he started a chapter of GO! Athletes. He was the recipient of the CorTech "Make an Impact" Scholarship Award.

He had a fragrance released by Xyrena called Formula 3, sales of which will support the LGBT sports organization "You Can Play". Fragrance industry analysts Basenotes claim that this is "the first signature fragrance from an openly gay athlete."

In December 2015, Maldonado was invited to speak at The Atlantic's inaugural LGBT summit in Washington D.C., aiming to "convene wide-ranging conversations on queer identity in America, at the end of a game-changing year in arenas from politics to pop culture".

Maldonado studied at Roger Williams University School of Law, where he served as president of the Alliance, RWU Law's LGBTQ+ student organization. He currently works as a public defender in the state of Florida.
