= Bond No. 9 =

American fragrance company

Bond No. 9 is an American, New York-based perfume house launched in 2003 by Laurice Rahmé. The products are for both men and women.

== Geography ==
Bond No. 9 has 5 eponymous boutiques in New York and is also sold at Saks Fifth Avenue, Harrods, Bloomingdale's, Hudson's Bay, Isetan, Sephora, and De Bijenkorf.

The company’s main shop is located at 9 Bond Street in the NoHo district of Manhattan. As part of the brand’s street marketing and branding, they chauffeur customers and media editors in an English taxi decorated like their bottles, referred to as “The Bond Mobile”.

== History ==
Bond No. 9 opened at 9 Bond Street in 2003 with 16 "neighborhood fragrances". By 2013, they had produced over 60 fragrances, including exclusive co-branded fragrance productions for Saks Fifth Avenue and Harrods. Most of the fragrances were inspired by New York City neighborhoods, including Central Park South, Gramercy Park, Madison Square Park, Manhattan, and many others. The Chinatown (2005) fragrance received critical acclaim.

In September 2013, in celebration of their 10-year anniversary, the company launched a perfume based on a fantasy neighborhood, Perfumista Avenue. That year they also launched what they claimed was the "first ever digital scent", with a scan-able QR code on the bottle in 2013.

Most of the fragrances produced by Bond No. 9 have 18-22% concentration of pure perfume oils, though some of their “pure perfume” scents have 30% perfume oil concentration, including Bond No. 9 Signature.

The company offers custom blending to customers, mixed by blenders who are referred to as Bond Perfumistas. This offering is a customized consultation that allows customers to blend and bottle their own customized metro-fragrance. The company also sells candles, pocket sprays, body creams, and limited-edition bottles covered in Swarovski crystals.

== Collaboration with Andy Warhol Foundation ==
Beginning in 2007, Bond No. 9 began a licensing partnership with the Andy Warhol Foundation for Visual Arts, allowing for the creation of fragrances bearing the Warhol name, with bottle designs inspired by his works of art.

The fragrances included: Andy Warhol Silver Factory (2007), Andy Warhol Union Square (2008), Andy Warhol Lexington Avenue (2008), Andy Warhol Success is a Job in New York (2009), Andy Warhol Montauk (2010), and Andy Warhol by Bond No. 9 (2011).

When the licensing agreement came to a close in 2013, Bond No. 9 kept the scents, but renamed and repackaged them.

== The I LOVE NY Collection ==
In 2011, Bond No. 9 launched a smaller capsule collection celebrating the entire State of New York, called the I LOVE NY by Bond No. 9 collection. The perfume bottles bear the "I Love NY" logo designed by Milton Glaser.

As of December 2013, the line consists of 8 fragrances: I LOVE NY for Him, Her, All, Mothers, Earth Day, Fathers, Marriage Equality and Holidays.

== Community activities ==
Bond No. 9 run an ongoing recycling program encouraging customers to bring empty bottles of any brand to their counter for refurbishing or recycling, often offering a gift in return.

In 2011, the company created an exclusive signature scent for Saks Fifth Avenue in New Orleans named Saks NOLA as New Orleans was rebuilding post Hurricane Katrina. Creating a unique scent for NOLA was a response to a personal request from Carolyn Elder of Saks Fifth Avenue.

In 2012, Bond No. 9 launched I LOVE NY for Earth Day as a celebration of the environmental movement and New York’s dedication to it. The fragrance is part of the collaboration with the State of New York, and a percentage of proceeds give directly back to the New York State Office of Parks, Recreation and Historic Preservation.

All Bond No. 9 products are locally produced in the New York metro area.

== Industry awards ==
In 2009, the fragrances Astor Place and Brooklyn won the FiFi Award for “Fragrance of the Year” in the Women’s and Men’s categories. In 2012, New York Oud won the FiFi Award for Perfume Extraordinaire.

In January 2006, company founder Laurice Rahmé won the "Beauty / Fragrance Entrepreneur Rising Star Award" at the 9th annual Rising Star Awards, sponsored by Fashion Group International (FGI).

In November 2012, Rahmé received the Cosmetic Executive Women (CEW) "Innovator of the Year" award.
