= Curious (fragrance) =

Perfume endorsed by Britney Spears

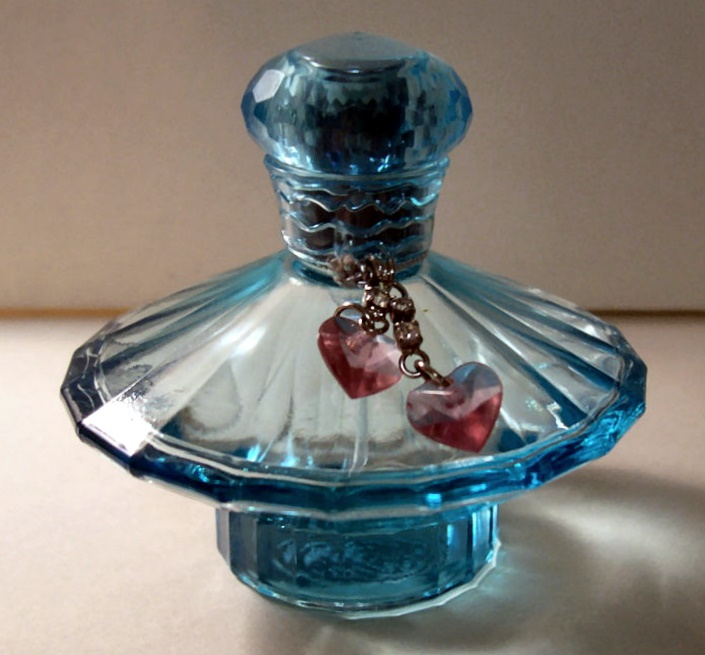

Fragrance by Britney Spears
- Released: September 14, 2004
- Label: Elizabeth Arden
- Tagline: Do You Dare?
- Flanker(s): Curious: In Control - Curious Heart
- Successor: Fantasy

Curious is Britney Spears' first fragrance in collaboration with Elizabeth Arden. It was created by perfumer Claude Dir and launched in the United States in September 2004, with an international rollout following in March 2005. The fragrance achieved strong commercial performance, becoming the best-selling fragrance of 2004 and generating over $100 million in sales. By 2011, Elizabeth Arden reported cumulative sales of more than 700 million units. Industry experts have linked its success in part to Spears’ cultural influence, noting her role in popularizing fragrance use among younger consumers.

== Conception ==
Initial reports of Britney Spears’ partnership with Elizabeth Arden appeared in March 2004. According to media accounts at the time, the first product planned under her name was a fragrance, with later extensions into cosmetics and skincare expected, though not for at least another two years. In an interview with WWD, Spears said she was excited to develop her own line with Elizabeth Arden and expressed enthusiasm for perfume and cosmetics in general. The collaboration went beyond a licensing agreement, as executives at Arden noted her involvement throughout development. Paul West, president of the company, stated that Spears took part in different stages of the process, including concept development, packaging ideas, marketing direction, and input on scent composition, having already suggested bottle designs and fragrance notes.

The fragrance Curious was formally announced in June 2004 through a press release confirming its planned release that fall. Paul West described Spears as a “talented, fashionable woman” with appeal to younger, international consumers. The product was positioned within Elizabeth Arden’s prestige fragrance line and scheduled for distribution in select high-end department stores, including retailers that did not typically carry the brand, such as Nordstrom. Spears joined a celebrity portfolio that included Catherine Zeta-Jones, associated with the Elizabeth Arden brand, and Elizabeth Taylor, who had her own fragrance line. Her target audience differed from theirs, focusing primarily on consumers aged 15 to 30.

== Release ==
It’s so great that all of you are here today to help Elizabeth Arden and me [and] my fragrance Curious go global […] When we were making it, we knew it was something special.[…] It’s really nice to share something so personal and special with people that I really love, with my fans and everyone who wears it, and now I’m very happy that everybody around the world can enjoy it.

— Britney Spears on the global launch of Curious.

The United States launch of Curious took place in New York City on September 14, 2004, with events held at the Four Seasons Hotel and Macy's. Spears attended the launch alongside Elizabeth Arden executives Scott Beattie, Ron Rolleston, and Tamara Steele. In interviews promoting the fragrance, Spears described it as containing vanilla musk notes and stated that she had been involved in its development.

Following its U.S. debut, Curious was introduced to additional international markets. Elizabeth Arden announced plans to expand the fragrance into travel retail outlets in Europe and the Middle East by March 2005. The company marketed the fragrance primarily to consumers between the ages of 12 and 28, a demographic that overlapped with Spears' fan base. Elizabeth Arden reported strong early sales at major U.S. department stores and expanded distribution through international retail channels.

The global launch of Curious took place on March 18, 2005, at the Ritz-Carlton Hotel in New Orleans, Louisiana. The event included contest winners from several countries, including Australia, Germany, Italy, Japan, Singapore, South Africa, Spain, and Ireland who joined Spears during the launch. Commenting on the fragrance's early performance, Elizabeth Arden chairman and chief executive officer Scott Beattie attributed its success to a combination of the product's scent, packaging, marketing campaign, and Spears' popularity.

== Scent and Packaging ==
Curious was created by Claude Dir of Quest International in collaboration with Ann Gottlieb Associates. The fragrance features top notes of Louisiana magnolia, Anjou pear, and lotus flower; middle notes of tuberose, star jasmine, and pink cyclamen. Base notes include vanilla musk, sandalwood, and blond woods.

The bottle consists of multifaceted blue glass decorated with pink heart-shaped charms. The 100 ml eau de parfum version is topped with a blue atomizer. Elizabeth Arden worked with Spears on the bottle and packaging design. According to Tamara Steele, the company's vice president of fragrance, Spears wanted a "young and fresh" look and suggested using antique perfume bottles with atomizers as inspiration for the design. The bottle and carton incorporated a retro style, with pink and azure blue, two of Spears' preferred colors, used in the floral carton design alongside black accents.

The outer carton combines pink and blue colors with a black top featuring cutout details. Jean Antretter, Elizabeth Arden's senior design director, developed the packaging. Its origami-inspired structure consists of three paperboard components and two internal vacuum-formed trays that hold the bottle. When the lid is lifted, one of the trays moves with it, revealing the fragrance. The lid is stamped with pink, blue, and silver foils in three separate passes and finished with a high-gloss ultraviolet coating. The origami base was designed to open when the lid was removed, revealing the bottle inside.

== Marketing ==
Elizabeth Arden promoted the release of Curious through a campaign called "Britney Buzz", which featured Britney Spears and targeted her teenage fan base. he campaign was developed by the advertising agency Goodby, Silverstein & Partners and used the slogan "Do You Dare?", which also appeared in the fragrance's television advertisements.

Online advertising and mobile communications played a central role in the campaign. Advertisements featuring Spears appeared on websites aimed at teenage audiences, including Bolt.com, Alloy.com, MTV.com, Seventeen.com, and CosmoGirl.com. Some of the advertisements invited visitors to enter their mobile phone numbers and ZIP codes to receive promotional messages. Those who registered received prerecorded voice messages from Spears, thanking them for their interest and introducing the fragrance. Mediaweek reported that approximately 30,000 girls registered their phone numbers. In the weeks before the fragrance's release, participants also received text messages, including notifications about the scheduled broadcast of its television advertisement on MTV.

The campaign extended to AOL Instant Messenger and Spears' official website, where fans could access additional promotional material. Visitors to the website could also preview the television advertisement by sending a text message containing the word "CURIOUS" to a designated short code. Other mobile promotions included text messages, ringtones, and downloadable wallpapers. In-person promotions included contests, giveaways, and events such as the "Ultimate Girls Night Out" and "Weekend Spa Getaway". Elizabeth Arden also employed a group of Britney Spears look-alikes, known as "Spears Peers", who appeared at promotional events to introduce consumers to the fragrance The campaign extended beyond online and mobile advertising to include magazine and radio promotions, retail activities, television appearances, and public relations in major US markets.

Television programming provided additional exposure for the fragrance. Advertisements aired on MTV, including during Total Request Live, while E! Online featured programmes dedicated to Curious, including a special about the fragrance and behind-the-scenes material featuring Spears. Promotional materials described the initiative as a year-round campaign, combining television, print, online, mobile, and in-store advertising.

=== TV Commercial ===
The television commercial for Curious was directed by Dave Meyers, who had previously directed Spears' music videos for Lucky (2000) and Boys (The Co-Ed Remix) (2002). Titled "Curious – Hotel Rooms", the advertisement stars Spears and actor Eric Winter. It was done by Goodby Silverstein & Partners San Francisco advertising agency.

The commercial depicts Spears and Winter exchanging glances before entering neighboring hotel rooms. As they think about one another, Spears approaches his door while fantasy sequences are intercut throughout the advertisement. These scenes include imagery such as flowers, dolls, cartoons, and a rodeo. The commercial ends with Spears looking toward the camera as the slogan "Do You Dare?" is heard and the fragrance bottle appears on screen.

The advertisement premiered on Elizabeth Arden's website on September 17, 2004, through the Britney Spears Beauty section. According to Elizabeth Arden executive Ron Rolleston, consumer interest in the campaign generated significant traffic to the company's website following its release with over 500,000 downloads during its first day.

=== Curious: Promo CD ===
Curious Promo CD

EP by Britney Spears
- Released: 2004
- Genre: Pop
- Length: 8:18
- Label: Jive Records

A limited edition gift extended play (EP) was released along with the launch of the fragrance. The CD features the songs "Someday (I Will Understand)" and "Mona Lisa" previously released in her EP Britney & Kevin: Chaotic and a remix of the former available in her first remix album B in the Mix: The Remixes. The EP was an enhanced CD which also came with the TV commercial directed by Dave Meyers.

==== Track listing ====
No.	Title	Writer(s)	Producer(s)	Length
1.	"Someday (I Will Understand)"	Britney Spears	Guy Sigsworth	3:37
2.	"Mona Lisa"	Spears; Teddy Campbell; David Kochanski	Bloodshy & Avant	3:25
3.	"Someday (I Will Understand) Hi-Bias Signature Radio Remix"	Spears	Sigsworth; Nick Fiorucci; Taras Harkavyi	3:46
4.	"Curious Fragrance Commercial"			0:30
Total length:				8:18

== Reception and Impact ==
Following its release in September 2004, Curious became one of the most successful fragrance launches in Elizabeth Arden's history. The fragrance ranked among the top-selling perfumes in United States department stores during the 2004 holiday season and generated approximately $30 million in retail sales during its first three months on the market. In December 2004, Elizabeth Arden reported that Curious was the top-selling beauty product on Amazon.com during the month of November. The fragrance also performed well in Canada, Australia, and New Zealand. According to the company, it became the most successful fragrance launch at Myer, one of Australia's largest department store chains, within its first five weeks of sales.

Chairman and chief executive officer Scott Beattie described Curious as one of Elizabeth Arden's strongest fragrance launches in recent years. Company president and chief operating officer Paul West reported that sales in New Zealand exceeded those of previous fragrance launches and contributed to Elizabeth Arden holding four of the country's five best-selling fragrance positions during the holiday season. The commercial success of Curious coincided with increases in Elizabeth Arden's financial results. During the final quarter of 2004, company sales rose from $296.3 million to $323 million. In the first quarter of 2005, sales increased from $154 million to $187 million. Elizabeth Arden attributed part of this growth to the expansion of Curious into additional retail outlets in the U.S. and international markets.

In terms of the fragrance's reception within the public, fragrance consultant Sue Phillips commented that Curious appealed to younger consumers at a time when many associated perfume with older age groups. She described the fragrance as having a youthful character that differed from many fragrances marketed to young women at the time. Industry analysts also linked the fragrance's success to Spears' popularity among younger consumers. According to data from the NPD Group, 81 percent of young women were aware of the fragrance following its release, a level of recognition comparable to that of established body-care brands marketed to the same demographic. Karen Grant, vice president and global beauty analyst for the NPD Group, stated that Spears contributed to increased interest in fragrance among younger consumers and helped expand awareness of the category.

The marketing campaign supporting Curious also received recognition within the advertising industry. In June 2005, Mediaweek named the campaign its Media Plan of the Year for its use of nontraditional media. The publication reported that the mobile marketing initiative had attracted approximately 30,000 registrations and that the integration of mobile messaging with Spears' online fan communities generated additional publicity for the fragrance. Elizabeth Arden executives also highlighted the importance of digital promotion in reaching younger consumers, who were less likely to engage with traditional fragrance advertising. In its 2005 annual report, the company described the "Britney Buzz" campaign as an innovative promotional initiative that combined online advertising, text messaging, recorded voice messages from Spears, and promotional events organized around the "Do You Dare?" slogan.

== Flankers ==
Elizabeth Arden released two additional versions of Curious in 2006 and 2008, respectively. Both versions retained some of the original fragrance's notes while introducing different top and middle notes.

№	Fragrance	Tagline	Perfumer	Top Notes	Middle Notes	Base Notes	Year	Ref.
1	Curious: In Control	"Are You?"	Claude Dir	Loquat Fruit	Midnight Orchid, Crème Brûlée, Black Vanilla Bean, Tonka Crystals	Sandalwood, Musk	2006	
2	Curious Heart	"Live Yours to the Fullest"	Claude Dir	Lotus, Magnolia, Pear	Cyclamen, Tuberose, Jasmine	Vanilla, Musk, White Woods, Sandalwood	2008	

== Accolades ==
Curious received several industry and consumer awards, including The Fragrance Foundation and Glammy Awards which recognize creative achievements, artistic craftsmanship, and excellence in the global perfume and scent community.

Year	Award	Category	Ref.
2004	WWD BeautyBiz	Breakthrough Product of the Year	
2004	The Fragrance Foundation Awards	Consumer’s Choice - Women's	
2005	Mediaweek Award	Best Alternative Media Plan	
2005	Raven Fox Awards	Best New Product Launch	
2005	Packaging Gold Awards	Cosmetics	
2009	FiFi Awards	Consumer’s Choice Award	
2006-2010	Glammy Awards	Best Fragrance	
