= William Lyon Mackenzie Collegiate Institute =

High-school in Toronto, Canada

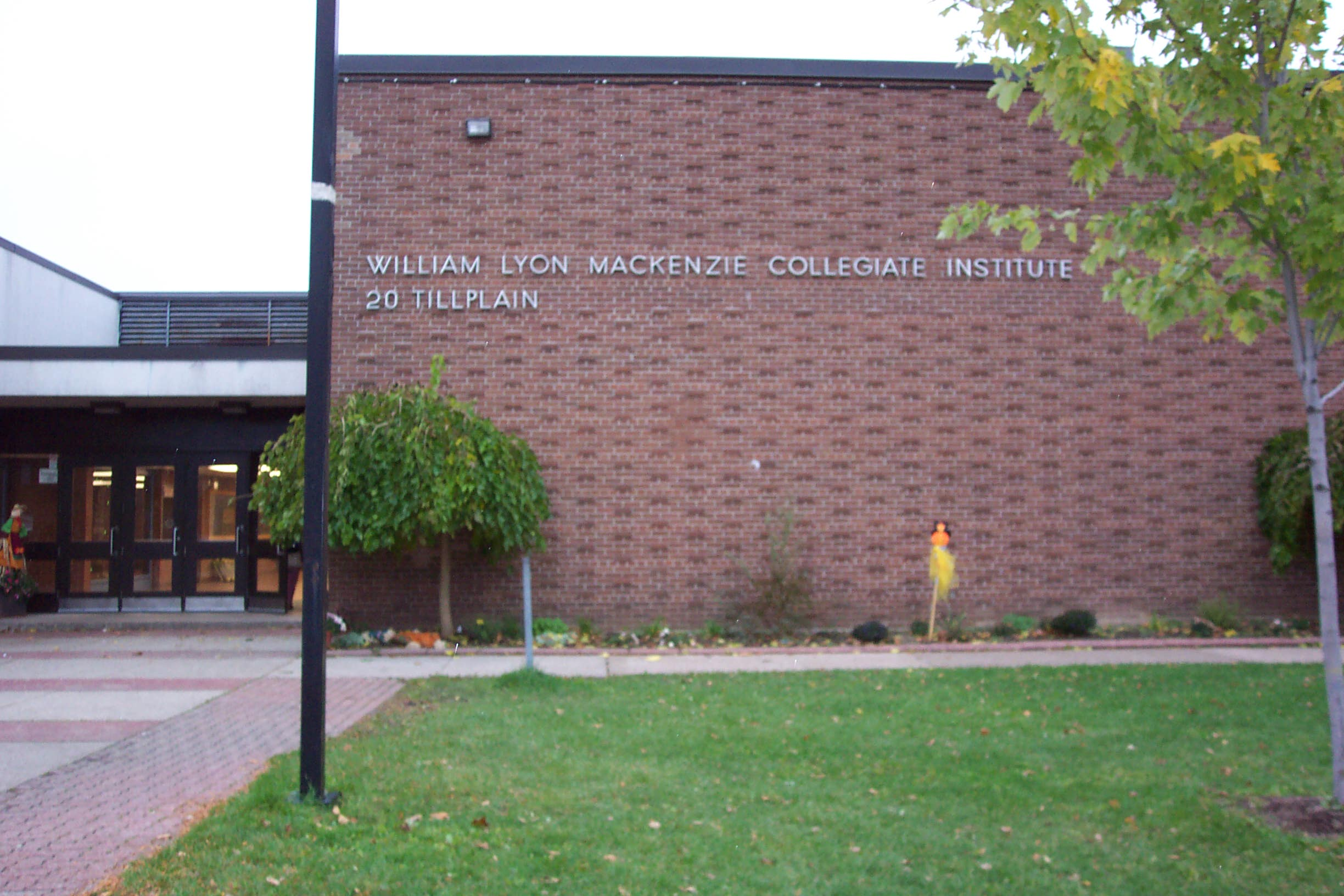

Location
- 20 Tillplain Road; Toronto, Ontario, M3H 5R2; Canada; 43.753581°N 79.461649°W

Information
- Other names: Mac, MAC, Mackenzie
- Former name: Southview Heights Secondary School
- School type: High school
- Motto: Latin: Sua praemia laudi (Merit has its own reward)
- Founded: 1960
- School board: Toronto District School Board
- Superintendent: Ainsworth Morgan
- Area trustee: Alexandra Lulka Rotman; Ward 5
- School number: 3444 / 950130
- Principal: Maria Neag
- Grades: 9–12
- Enrolment: 1410 (2023-2024)
- Language: English
- Schedule type: Semestered
- Colours: Blue, gold, and white
- Mascot: Lyon
- Team name: WLMAC Lyons
- Newspaper: The Lyon
- Website: www.wlmac.ca

William Lyon Mackenzie Collegiate Institute is a semestered high school located in Toronto, Canada. The school was opened in 1960 by the North York Board of Education. It is located near Sheppard Avenue West and Allen Road, close to Sheppard West subway station.

== History ==
The school, originally called Southview Heights Secondary School, was built in 1959. The purpose of the school was twofold: to accommodate the skyrocketing number of new students in the area, and to ease overcrowding at Northview Heights Secondary School. The school opened in September 1960. It was originally slated to be a junior high school.

A contest for the school's name was held and William Lyon Mackenzie, the first mayor of Toronto and leader of the Upper Canada Rebellion in 1837, was selected.

The school, in its inception, had 90% of the Jewish student population that lived in the Bathurst Manor neighborhood. It achieved very high scholastic results and in 1967 was ranked 2nd among Toronto's top high schools.

== Students ==
The school is known for the high academic standards of its students. The Fraser Institute ranks it as the best TDSB secondary school. Over 95% of its graduating students are accepted into a post-secondary institution. Additionally, 50% of graduating students earn an 80% average in all of their subjects (down from 66% in 2006, when the average was based on the top three subjects), qualifying them to become Ontario Scholars. In 2013, the students with the highest averages in the entire TDSB were Mackenzie students.

== Specialty programs ==
=== MaCS Program ===
The MaCS Program began in 1985; it offers enriched English, Mathematics, Science, and Technology courses for advanced students.

=== Advanced Placement (AP) Program ===
The Advanced Placement Program has been active at the school since 2002 with the AP Computer Science course (ICS 4U0). Since then, AP Calculus and Chemistry have also been added to the school's Advanced Placement Program. As of 2018 the only available AP classes were Calculus, Economics, and Computer Science

=== FIT Program ===
The school offers a national certification program known as the FIT Program that will enable students to earn industry standard certifications in programming and engineering, and in Media & Communications Arts. The program is made possible through the Information and Communications Technology Council of Canada as part of the Education/Sector Council Partnership Project. Usually, it is the students in the MaCS program that attain the FIT certification. Students who completed all the required courses are eligible for the FIT Plus Certificate if they do a Cooperative component or summer internship in a field related to Engineering, Programming or Media Communication & Arts.

The following courses must be completed to receive the FIT Certificate: Computer Science (ICS 3U + ICS 4U), Cisco IT Essentials (TEJ 3M + TEJ 4M), Media Arts (TGJ 3M + TGJ 4M), and (for the FIT Plus certificate only) a co-operative education component.

== Sports ==
The school's sports teams include: badminton, wrestling, rugby, boys' and girls' field hockey, boys' and girls' volleyball, boys' and girls' soccer, and boys' varsity baseball.

== Notable alumni ==
- Honey Sherman - billionaire, wife of Apotex founder Barry Sherman
- Mark S. Fox - University of Toronto computer science professor
- Howie Mandel - comedian, actor, and host of Deal or No Deal. (Expelled, did not graduate)
- Mark Adler - Member of Parliament (2011–2015) for the Toronto riding of York Centre
- Roman Baber - Member of Provincial Parliament (2018–Present) for the Toronto riding of York Centre
- Avery Saltzman - actor, co-artistic director of the Harold Green Jewish Theatre Company
- Lorne Rubenstein - golf writer / expert
- DerHova - music producer, founder of the group Temperance
- Jerry Levitan - Emmy-winning producer
- Matti Friedman - journalist and author
- Mel Cappe - Officer of the Order of Canada (2002–2006)
- David Bloom - former CEO, Shoppers Drug Mart
- Yank Azman - actor
- Jeanne Beker - Canadian television personality and magazine editor
- Herbert L. Becker - actor, author, magician, TV producer
- Tinsel Korey - actress in the Twilight series
- Ben Mink - musician and composer
- Alice Panikian - Miss Universe Canada 2006
- Inga Skaya - Miss Universe Canada 2007
- Alex Shnaider - billionaire and philanthropist
- Rayne Fisher-Quann - sex education activist
- David Mock - Former Dean, University of Toronto Faculty of Dentistry
- Jay S. Hennick - Billionaire and CEO and Chairperson of Colliers International

== See also ==
- Education in Ontario
- List of secondary schools in Ontario
