= David Bloom (disambiguation) =

David Bloom (1963–2003) was an American television journalist and reporter.

David Bloom may also refer to:

- David Bloom (Canadian) (1943–2016), Canadian businessman, CEO of Shoppers Drug Mart
- David E. Bloom (born 1955), American academic
- David Bloom (musician) (born 1954), American guitarist, flautist and composer
- David P. Bloom (born 1964), American criminal and fraudster
- David Bloom (physician), an American dermatologist who first described Bloom syndrome in 1954

== See also ==
- David Blom (born 1998), American politician
