= And Then We Kiss =

2005 promotional single by Britney Spears

Promotional single by Britney Spears

from the album B in the Mix: The Remixes
- Released: October 31, 2005
- Recorded: 2003
- Studio: Computer Hell Cabin (Los Angeles, CA)
- Genre: Eurotrance; techno
- Length: 4:28
- Label: Jive
- Songwriters: Britney Spears; Mark Taylor; Paul Barry
- Producers: Mark Taylor; Junkie XL

Audio video
- "And Then We Kiss" on YouTube

"And Then We Kiss" is a song by American singer Britney Spears. It was written by Spears, Mark Taylor and Paul Barry, while production was handled by Taylor. The song did not make the final track listing of Spears' fourth studio album, In the Zone (2003), and was later remixed by Junkie XL for inclusion on Spears' first remix album, B in the Mix: The Remixes (2005). It was also included on the extended play released to promote the remix album, titled Key Cuts from Remixed (2005). The Junkie XL remix of "And Then We Kiss" was released as a promotional single in Australia and New Zealand on October 31, 2005. The original version produced only by Taylor leaked online in September 2011.

The Junkie XL remix of "And Then We Kiss" is a Eurotrance song with influences of techno and usage of dance-rock guitars, synthesizers and symphonic strings. The lyrics speak about a kiss and the different sensations that a woman experiences, including trembling, crying and moaning. Junkie XL explained that he wanted to make the song a 2006 version of Depeche Mode's "Enjoy the Silence". The Junkie XL remix of "And Then We Kiss" was well received by music critics, with some noticing its potential to be a radio or club hit. The song failed to appear on any major record charts, however, it peaked at number 15 on the US Billboard Hot Dance Airplay.

== Background ==
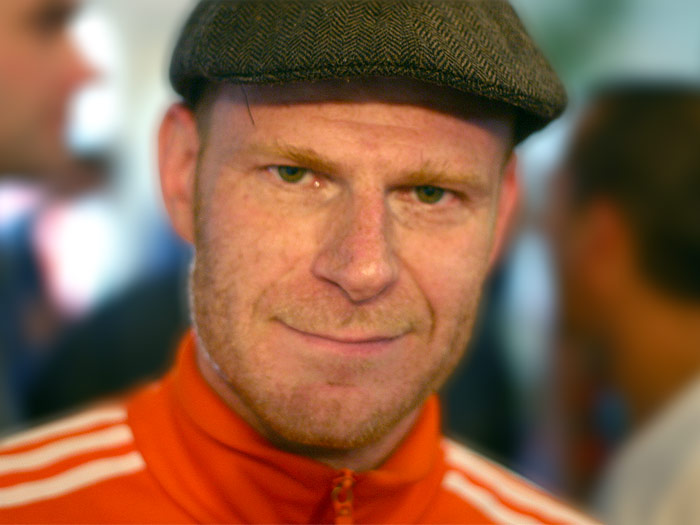
Junkie XL remixed "And Then We Kiss" for inclusion on B in the Mix: The Remixes.

"And Then We Kiss" was written by Spears, Mark Taylor and Paul Barry, while produced by Taylor. The song was recorded in the same sessions as "Breathe on Me", and was originally intended for In the Zone (2003). This version produced by Taylor features an electronica vibe reminiscent of Madonna's Ray of Light (1998), and contains a flamenco guitar with prominent lead vocals by Spears. "And Then We Kiss" was set to be included as a UK and Japan bonus track on Britney & Kevin: Chaotic (2005), but was replaced with "Over to You Now" for unknown reasons.

The song was remixed by Junkie XL and released on her remix album B in the Mix: The Remixes (2005). In the album credits, both Taylor and Junkie XL were listed as producers of the song. All instruments, including guitar, bass guitar, synths and drums, were played by Junkie XL. Audio mastering was done by Chaz Harper at Battery Mastering. In September 2005, it was announced by Billboard that the remix would serve as the music for the ad campaign behind Spears' fragrance, Fantasy. The Junkie XL Remix was released as a promotional single from B in the Mix: The Remixes on October 31, 2005, in Australia and New Zealand, as "And Then We Kiss". The version of the song produced by Taylor remained unreleased for years, until a new mix of the song labeled as the original version leaked online on September 2, 2011. After suggestions that it may be a fake, Taylor confirmed its authenticity to Bradley Stern of Muumuse.com on September 5, 2011.

The Junkie XL Mix appears in the 2007 video game Dance Dance Revolution Supernova 2 for the PlayStation 2 in North America.

== Composition ==
"And Then We Kiss"
A 26-second sample of the song's chorus, where Spears sings over a euro-trance melody.

"And Then We Kiss" is four minutes and twenty-eight seconds long. It is a Eurotrance song with influences of techno and usage of synthesizers. The song blends dance-rock guitars and symphonic strings and closes with an orchestral overtone. Its lyrics talk about a kiss and the different sensations that the protagonist experiences, including trembling, crying and moaning. At the beginning she sings the lines "Lying alone / touching my skin" which suggest that the whole song may actually be a fantasy. Spears's vocals are much less prominent than on the original version. In an interview with About.com, Junkie XL said he wanted to turn the song "into a 2006 version of Enjoy the Silence with really electronic chunky beats and nice melodic guitar lines. Besides the fact that [Britney]'s singing on it, it could be a track off my album because it's the same vibe. I'm really happy with the end result and so are they."

== Reception ==
The Junkie XL Remix of "And Then We Kiss" received positive reviews from music critics. Jennifer Vineyard of MTV noted "And Then We Kiss" had "the potential to be a radio or club hit — if Jive were actively promoting [B in the Mix]". Barry Walters of Rolling Stone said the remix "brings a simpatico blend of symphonic strings and dance-rock guitars" in its melody, while Spence D. of IGN noted Junkie XL makes "the remix an understated swatch of atmospheric neo-goth poing and staccato rhythms." A reviewer of Yahoo! Shopping considered the song "dreamy". Kurt Kirton of About.com said that the remixes of "And Then We Kiss", "Toxic", "Touch of My Hand", "Someday (I Will Understand)" and "...Baby One More Time" "hold their own"; Gregg Shapiro of the Bay Area Reporter, however, said "the many flaws in Spears' reedy, cold and mechanical voice are brought to the forefront" in the remixes. MTV writer Bradley Stern praised Junkie XL, writing, "the sublime remix found producer Junkie XL taking the (still) unreleased studio version of "And Then We Kiss" [...] and smoothing it over into one of Britney's most lush, mature musical moments of all time."

"And Then We Kiss" was not officially released as promotional single in the United States, therefore it was not eligible at the time to appear on Billboard's Hot 100. Even so, promotional vinyls were sent to radio stations, who started to play the song unofficially and it managed to garner enough airplay to appear on the Hot Dance Airplay chart of Billboard in early 2006. It debuted at number 25 on the chart issue dated February 25, 2006, reaching a new position of 23 on the following issue. After five weeks on the chart, "And Then We Kiss" reached a peak of 15, on the chart issue dated March 25, 2006. The song spent a total of eleven weeks on the chart, making its last appearance on the week of May 6, 2006. Despite being released in Australia and New Zealand, "And Then We Kiss" failed to appear on major charts of both countries.

== Track listing ==
- Digital download
1. "And Then We Kiss" – 4:28
- 12" vinyl
1. "And Then We Kiss" (Junkie XL Remix) – 4:28
2. "And Then We Kiss" (Junkie XL Remix Instrumental) – 4:28
3. "And Then We Kiss" (Junkie XL Undressed Remix) – 4:41
4. "And Then We Kiss" (Junkie XL Undressed Remix Instrumental) – 4:41

== Credits and personnel ==
- Britney Spears — lead vocals, songwriting
- Michael Taylor — songwriting
- Paul Barry — songwriting
- Mark Taylor — producer
- Junkie XL — producer, remixer, all instruments
- Chaz Harper — audio mastering

Credits and personnel adapted from B in the Mix: The Remixes album liner notes.

== Charts ==
=== Weekly charts ===
Chart (2006)	Peak position
CIS Airplay (TopHit) Junkie XL Remix	12
Israel International Airplay (Media Forest)	1
Russia Airplay (TopHit) Junkie XL Remix	10
Ukraine Airplay (TopHit)	93
US Hot Dance Airplay (Billboard)	15

=== Monthly charts ===
Chart (2006)	Position
CIS (TopHit) Junkie XL Remix	11

=== Year-end charts ===
Chart (2006)	Position
CIS (TopHit) Junkie XL Remix	42
Russia Airplay (TopHit) Junkie XL Remix	63
