= B in the Mix: The Remixes =

2005 remix album by Britney Spears

- North American editions cover (Note: International editions cover features a black-and-white image of Spears behind the butterfly.)

Remix album by Britney Spears
- Released: November 22, 2005
- Recorded: 1998–2005
- Genres: Electronic; dance-pop; house; trance; electro; techno
- Length: 54:01
- Label: Jive
- Producers: Dave Audé; Bloodshy & Avant; Peter Rauhofer; Trixter; Penelope Magnet; Justice; Jimmy Harry; Shep Solomon; Bill Hamel; Barry Jamieson; Mark Taylor; Stuart Price; The Neptunes; Junkie XL; Guy Sigsworth; Valentin; Moby; Jason Nevins; Nick Fiorucci; Taras Harkavyi; Max Martin; Rami; Davidson Ospina; Robert John "Mutt" Lange; Hex Hector; Dezrok; Mac Quayle; Jeff Taylor

Britney Spears chronology
Britney & Kevin: Chaotic (2005)	B in the Mix: The Remixes (2005)	Blackout (2007)

B in the Mix: The Remixes is the first remix album by American singer Britney Spears. It was released on November 22, 2005, by Jive Records.

B in the Mix: The Remixes predominantly comprises remixes of tracks from Spears' fourth studio album In the Zone (2003), but also contains remixes of tracks from its predecessors ...Baby One More Time (1999), Oops!... I Did It Again (2000) and Britney (2001) to a lesser extent. It also included remixes of "Someday (I Will Understand)" (2005) and the previously unreleased "And Then We Kiss". Producers Peter Rauhofer, Justice, Bill Hamel, Stuart Price, Dave Audé, Junkie XL, Valentin, Jason Nevins, Nick Fiorucci, Taras Harkavyi, Davidson Ospina and Hex Hector made contributions to the album; their final product was an ambient and techno-influenced EDM record.

B in the Mix: The Remixes received mixed reviews from music critics, some of which called it a good remix compilation, while others argued that it was conceived as a product and criticized what they perceived as weak vocals. Commercially, the album peaked at number four on the US Dance/Electronic Albums and at number 134 on the US Billboard 200. While the album received minimal promotion compared to Spears' previous albums, the remix of "And Then We Kiss" was released as its sole promotional single in Oceania on October 31, 2005. The album's sequel, titled B in the Mix: The Remixes Vol. 2, was released on October 7, 2011.

== Recording and production ==
B in the Mix: The Remixes includes songs recorded for her previous albums, mostly In the Zone (2003), remixed by numerous disc jockeys and musicians, including Peter Rauhofer, Justice, Bill Hamel, Stuart Price, Dave Audé, Junkie XL, Valentin, Jason Nevins, Nick Fiorucci, Taras Harkavyi, Davidson Ospina, and Hex Hector. Price had previously remixed "Breathe on Me" from In the Zone for the limited edition bonus disc of Spears' first greatest hits album Greatest Hits: My Prerogative (2004).

B in the Mix: The Remixes also includes a remix of the previously unreleased song, "And Then We Kiss". It was originally produced by Mark Taylor and recorded for In the Zone, but failed to make the final cut. The song was then set to be included on the bonus disc of the DVD for Britney and Kevin: Chaotic (2005), but was left out in favor of another song, "Over to You Now". The original version of "And Then We Kiss" remained unreleased for years, until a new mix labelled as the original version leaked online on September 2, 2011. After suggestions that it might be fake, Taylor confirmed its authenticity on September 5.

== Music and lyrics ==
"And Then We Kiss"
A 26-second sample of the song's chorus, where Spears sings over a euro-trance melody.

The Bill Hamel remix of "Touch of My Hand" is a trance track with elements of ambient. Spears' voice has been described as "chopped up into skittering syllables and [...] becomes part of the beat". The album's fourth track, the Jacques Lu Cont's Thin White Duke Mix of "Breathe on Me" slows the beat from the original track making the song "darker and dirtier". The remix style was compared to songs by Kylie Minogue and Madonna. Dave Audé Slave Driver Mix of "I'm a Slave 4 U" consists of a guitar track and "quirky analog touches", according to Kurt Kirton of About.com. "And Then We Kiss" contains influences of euro-trance, techno and usage of synthesizers. The song blends dance-rock guitars and symphonic strings and closes with an orchestral overtone. Its lyrics talk about a kiss and the different sensations that the protagonist experiences, including trembling, crying and moaning. At the beginning she sings the lines "Lying alone / touching my skin" which suggest that the whole song may actually be a fantasy. The album's seventh track, the Valentin remix of "Everytime" contains a serious groove and pounding percussion, with usage of synthesizers. The Jason Nevins remix of "Early Mornin'" is considered the only hip hop song of B in the Mix: The Remixes.

== Title and artwork ==
On September 28, 2005, Jive Records announced through a press release that Spears would release a remix album titled Remixed. However, on November 8, it was reported by Jennifer Vineyard of MTV that the album was actually titled B in the Mix: The Remixes. The album had two cover artworks, the North American one and the international one. On the North American edition, Spears doesn't appear on the album cover; there is a red butterfly against a black background instead. Vineyard noted this, stating: "[the album] is being marketed in a more underground way than usually associated with a superstar act". On the international edition cover artwork, a black-and-white image of Spears appears behind the butterfly.

== Release and promotion ==
Jive Records originally planned to release a Japan-exclusive remix album Greatest Remixes in early 2005, but those plans fell through. The release of Spears' first remix album, then titled Remixed, was announced in September, when the promotional extended play (EP) Key Cuts from Remixed, including several remixes from the album, was released. A contest was launched on Spears' paid fan site for those who pre-ordered B in the Mix: The Remixes. The winner received a copy of Britney & Kevin: Chaotic, a bottle of Spears' fragrance Fantasy with an additional lotion and make-up kit, and a personalized autographed picture of Spears. On November 22, the day the album was released, a release party was held at an unspecified nightclub in Los Angeles, organized by Spears' management and the webmaster of the fansite WorldOfBritney.com. It was a limited event to 500 people, including members of the fan site and her official fan club. Spears commented: "I just wanted to say that I love the idea of all my fans getting together to celebrate the release of my new album. I was happy to help! I hope you have a great night out at the club and dance all night long!".

B in the Mix: The Remixes received considerably less promotion compared to Spears' previous releases, as Spears did not make any public appearances in its support. Although it produced no singles, the remix of "And Then We Kiss" was released as the sole promotional single from the album in Australia and New Zealand on October 31, 2005. A promotional 12-inch single featuring a new version of the remix was also released. The remix received mostly positive reviews from music critics, with some noticing its potential to be a radio or club hit. "And Then We Kiss" failed to appear on any major charts; however, it peaked at number 15 on the US Dance/Mix Show Airplay.

== Critical reception ==
Professional ratings
Review scores
Source	Rating
About.com	3/5 stars
AllMusic	2.5/5 stars
Bay Area Reporter	unfavorable
Entertainment Weekly	C
IGN	(6.9/10)
MTV	favorable
Rolling Stone	3/5 stars
The Dallas Morning News	mixed

B in the Mix: The Remixes received generally mixed reviews from music critics. Kurt Kirton of About.com highlighted the remixes of "Everytime" and "Don't Let Me Be the Last to Know", adding that the album would be better if it included more tracks. He summarized his review saying, "this is a decent release that should please any Britney fan and most club music fanatics". Barry Walters of Rolling Stone said the album was "even more redundant" than Greatest Hits: My Prerogative, but added that with the exception of "Toxic", "just about every original track is bettered here". Spence D. of IGN said: "If you had the choice to purchase only one Britney Spears' album, then this would be the one to spend your money on." Stephen Thomas Erlewine of AllMusic commented that "B in the Mix doesn't exactly erase the impression that Spears isn't in tune with her recording career". He also stated that on tracks such as "Toxic", "her flaws stand out just a bit too much [...] the instrumental hooks have been removed from the record, leaving Spears to carry the day—which she can't really do. [...] Overall this album sounds and feels like what it really is: a piece of product." MTV writer Bradley Stern praised the album, saying it "featured loads of excellent remixes stretching from "...Baby One More Time" to "Toxic", but nothing shined quite as bright as the album's undeniable highlight: "And Then We Kiss" (Junkie XL Remix)."

Gregg Shapiro of the Bay Area Reporter gave the album a mostly negative review, calling it "hazardous waste". He also noted that Spears's voice was "reedy, cold and mechanical" when stripped from the original mixes. However, he highlighted two tracks, saying: "Spears comes closest to achieving dance-diva status on the Valentin remix of "Everytime", while the Davidson Ospina 2005 remix of "Baby One More Time" elevates the original bubblegum track to club classic." Mike Daniel of The Dallas Morning News called the Justice remix of "Me Against the Music" the best track of the album, but said it "has the feel of a hastily executed stopgap measure with almost no marketing-related thought behind it except to fulfill the once-every-two-years release cycle that's been established for Britney material." Entertainment Weekly writer Leah Greenblatt noted the remixes "amps already-aggressive singles like "Toxic" and "Me Against the Music" to brain-popping levels of synth spiraling", and transforms "sad-eyed slow jams like "Everytime" and "Don't Let Me Be the Last to Know" into Hi-NRG bursts. This party is BYORB (Bring Your Own Red Bull); without it, you might not be able to keep up."

== Commercial performance ==
In the United States, B in the Mix: The Remixes debuted at number 134 on the Billboard 200, selling 14,000 copies in its first week. It spent eleven weeks on the chart overall. The album also peaked at number four on the US Top Dance/Electronic Albums, making it the first top four peak on the chart that had over 10,000 units sold since July 2002. The album spent a total of 21 weeks on the chart. As of 2020, it sold 138,000 copies in the United States.

The album also debuted on Ultratop Wallonia in Belgium at number 99 on the chart dated December 17, 2005, and also debuted at number 59 on the Italian Albums Chart on the chart dated November 25, 2005. The album peaked at number 25 on Oricon Albums Chart in Japan, where it spent eight weeks on the chart.

== Track listing ==
B in the Mix: The Remixes – Standard edition
No.	Title	Writer(s)	Producer(s)	Length
1.	"Toxic" (Peter Rauhofer Reconstruction Mix Edit)	Cathy Dennis; Christian Karlsson; Pontus Winnberg; Henrik Jonback	Bloodshy & Avant; Peter Rauhofer^{[a]}	6:46
2.	"Me Against the Music" (Justice Remix) (featuring Madonna)	Britney Spears; Madonna; C. "Tricky" Stewart; Thabiso "Tab" Nikhereanye; Penelope Magnet; Terius Nash; Gary O'Brien	Trixster; Magnet^{[b]}; Justice^{[a]}	4:01
3.	"Touch of My Hand" (Bill Hamel Remix)	Spears; Jimmy Harry; Balewa Muhammad; Shep Solomon	Harry; Solomon; Bill Hamel^{[a]}; Barry Jamieson^{[a]}	5:19
4.	"Breathe on Me" (Jacques Lu Cont's Thin White Duke Mix)	Stephen Lee; Steven Anderson; Lisa Greene	Mark Taylor; Stuart Price^{[a]}	3:55
5.	"I'm a Slave 4 U" (Dave Audé Slave Driver Mix)	Chad Hugo; Pharrell Williams	The Neptunes; Dave Audé^{[a]}	5:51
6.	"And Then We Kiss" (Junkie XL Remix)	Spears; Taylor; Paul Barry	Taylor; Junkie XL^{[a]}	4:27
7.	"Everytime" (Valentin Remix)	Spears; Annette Stamatelatos	Guy Sigsworth; Valentin^{[a]}	3:25
8.	"Early Mornin'" (Jason Nevins Remix)	Spears; Moby; Stewart; Magnet	Moby; Trixster^{[c]}; Magnet^{[c]}; Jason Nevins^{[a]}	3:38
9.	"Someday (I Will Understand)" (Hi-Bias Signature Radio Remix)	Spears	Sigsworth; Nick Fiorucci^{[a]}; Taras Harkavyi^{[a]}	3:46
10.	"...Baby One More Time" (Davidson Ospina 2005 Remix)	Max Martin	Martin; Rami; Davidson Ospina^{[a]}	4:38
11.	"Don't Let Me Be the Last to Know" (Hex Hector Club Mix Edit)	Robert John "Mutt" Lange; Shania Twain; Keith Scott	Lange; Hex Hector^{[a]}; Dezrok^{[a]}	8:15
Total length:				54:01

B in the Mix: The Remixes – UK edition (bonus tracks)
No.	Title	Writer(s)	Producer(s)	Length
12.	"Stronger" (Mac Quayle Mixshow Edit)	Martin; Rami	Martin; Rami; Mac Quayle^{[a]}	5:21
13.	"I'm Not a Girl, Not Yet a Woman" (Metro Remix)	Martin; Rami; Dido	Martin; Rami; M. Taylor^{[a]}; Jeff Taylor^{[a]}	5:25
Total length:				64:34

B in the Mix: The Remixes – Japanese edition (bonus tracks)
No.	Title	Writer(s)	Producer(s)	Length
14.	"Someday (I Will Understand)" (Gota Remix) (featuring MCU)	Spears	Sigsworth	4:42
Total length:				69:36

B in the Mix: The Remixes – iTunes Store deluxe edition (bonus tracks)
No.	Title	Writer(s)	Producer(s)	Length
12.	"Toxic" (Peter Rauhofer Reconstruction Mix Radio Edit)	Dennis; Karlsson; Winnberg; Jonback	Bloodshy & Avant; Rauhofer^{[a]}	4:30
13.	"Touch of My Hand" (Bill Hamel Dub)	Spears; Harry; Muhammad; Solomon	Harry; Solomon; Hamel^{[a]}; Jamieson^{[a]}	7:17
14.	"I'm a Slave 4 U" (Dave Audé Slave Driver Extended Mix)	Hugo; Williams	The Neptunes; Audé^{[a]}	7:05
Total length:				72:53

== Key Cuts from Remixed ==
Key Cuts from Remixed

EP by Britney Spears
- Released: September 2005
- Genres: Electronic; dance-pop; house; trance
- Length: 24:41 (promotional CD); 15:42 (commercial 12"); 23:50 (promotional 12")
- Label: Jive
- Producers: Junkie XL; Justice; Bill Hamel; Peter Rauhofer; Jacques Lu Cont

Britney Spears chronology
Britney & Kevin: Chaotic (2005)	Key Cuts from Remixed (2005)	B in the Mix: The Remixes (2005)

To promote the album, Jive Records released an extended play in September 2005, containing several remixes from B in the Mix: The Remixes. This EP, known as Key Cuts from Remixed, was sent around to DJs in both 12" vinyl and CD format. This EP was made available on streaming platforms under the title of Britney Spears Remix Sampler.

=== Track listing ===
Key Cuts from Remixed – promotional CD
No.	Title	Writer(s)	Producer(s)	Length
1.	"And Then We Kiss" (Junkie XL Remix)	Britney Spears; M. Taylor; Paul Barry	M. Taylor; Junkie XL^{[a]}	4:28
2.	"Me Against the Music" (featuring Madonna) (Justice Remix)	Spears; Madonna; C. "Tricky" Stewart; Thabiso "Tab" Nikhereanye; Penelope Magnet; Terius Nash; Gary O'Brien	Trixster; Magnet^{[b]}; Justice^{[a]}	4:08
3.	"Touch of My Hand" (Bill Hamel Remix)	Spears; Jimmy Harry; Balewa Muhammad; Shep Solomon	Harry; Solomon; Bill Hamel^{[a]}; Barry Jamieson^{[a]}	5:20
4.	"Toxic" (Peter Rauhofer Reconstruction Mix (Edit))	Cathy Dennis; Christian Karlsson; Pontus Winnberg; Henrik Jonback	Bloodshy & Avant; Peter Rauhofer^{[a]}	6:45
5.	"Breathe on Me" (Jacques Lu Cont's Thin White Duke Mix)	Stephen Lee; Steven Anderson; Lisa Greene	Mark Taylor; Stuart Price^{[a]}	4:00
Total length:				24:41

Key Cuts from Remixed – commercial 12" vinyl
No.	Title	Writer(s)	Producer(s)	Length
1.	"Touch of My Hand" (Bill Hamel 12" Remix)	Spears; Harry; Muhammad; Solomon	Harry; Solomon; Hamel^{[a]}; Jamieson^{[a]}	7:44
2.	"Toxic" (Peter Rauhofer Reconstruction Mix)	Dennis; Karlsson; Winnberg; Jonback	Bloodshy & Avant; Rauhofer^{[a]}	7:58
Total length:				15:42

Key Cuts from Remixed – promotional 12" vinyl
No.	Title	Writer(s)	Producer(s)	Length
1.	"Touch of My Hand" (Bill Hamel 12" Remix)	Spears; Harry; Muhammad; Solomon	Harry; Solomon; Hamel^{[a]}; Jamieson^{[a]}	7:44
2.	"Me Against the Music" (featuring Madonna) (Justice Remix)	Spears; Madonna; Stewart; Nikhereanye; Magnet; Nash; O'Brien	Trixster; Magnet^{[b]}; Justice^{[a]}	4:08
3.	"Toxic" (Peter Rauhofer Reconstruction Mix)	Dennis; Karlsson; Winnberg; Jonback	Bloodshy & Avant; Rauhofer^{[a]}	7:58
4.	"Breathe on Me" (Jacques Lu Cont's Thin White Duke Mix)	Lee; Anderson; Greene	Taylor; Price^{[a]}	4:00
Total length:				23:50

Notes

- ^{^a} signifies a remixer and additional producer
- ^{^b} signifies a co-producer
- ^{^c} signifies a vocal producer

== Personnel ==
Credits are adapted from the Japanese edition liner notes of B in the Mix: The Remixes.

- Steve Anderson – songwriting (track 4)
- Dido Armstrong – songwriting (track 13)
- Dave Audé – additional production (track 5), remix production (track 5)
- Paul Barry – songwriting (track 6)
- Bloodshy & Avant – engineering (track 1), production (track 1), songwriting (track 1)
- Anthony Carlucci – photography
- Cathy Dennis – songwriting (track 1)
- Dezrok – additional production (track 11), remix production (track 11)
- Dan Dymtrow – management
- Nick Fiorucci – remix production (track 9)
- Lisa Greene – songwriting (track 4)
- Chris Haggerty – digital editing (track 11)
- Bill Hamel – additional production (track 3), keys (track 3), percussion (track 3), remix production (track 3)
- Taras Harkavyi – remix production (track 9)
- Chaz Harper – mastering (all tracks)
- Jimmy Harry – production (track 3), songwriting (track 3)
- Hex Hector – additional production (track 11), remix production (track 11)
- Barry Jamieson – additional production (track 3), keys (track 3), percussion (track 3), remix production (track 3)
- Henrik Jonback – songwriting (track 1)
- Junkie XL – additional production (track 6), instrumentation (track 6), remix production (track 6)
- Justice – additional production (track 2), remix production (track 2)
- Eric Kupper – keyboards (track 1)
- Robert John "Mutt" Lange – production (track 11), songwriting (track 11)
- Claude Le Gache – keyboards (track 5)
- Chris Lee – guitar (track 5)
- Stephen Lee – songwriting (track 4)
- Steve Lunt – A&R
- Mac Quayle – additional production (track 12), remix production (track 12)
- Madonna – songwriting (track 2), vocals (track 2)
- Penelope Magnet – songwriting (tracks 2 and 8), production (track 2), vocal arrangement (track 8), vocal production (track 8)
- Max Martin – engineering (track 10), mixing (tracks 10, 12 and 13), production (tracks 10, 12 and 13), songwriting (tracks 10, 12 and 13)
- MCU – vocals (track 14)
- Steve Miller – mixing (track 5)
- MJN – backing vocals (track 8)
- Moby – engineering (track 8), production (track 8), songwriting (track 8)
- Balewa Muhammad – songwriting (track 3)
- Jackie Murphy – art direction, design
- Terius Nash – songwriting (track 2)
- The Neptunes – songwriting (track 5), production (track 5)
- Jason Nevins – additional production (track 8), arrangement (track 8), remix production (track 8)
- Michael Nigro – keyboard programming (track 8)
- Thabiso "Tab" Nikhereanye – songwriting (track 2)
- Gary O'Brien – songwriting (track 2)
- Davidson Ospina – arrangement (track 9), remix production (track 9)
- Stuart Price (Note: Stuart Price was credited under his parodic French moniker Jacques Lu Cont.) – additional production (track 4), remix production (track 4)
- Rami – engineering (track 10), mixing (tracks 10 and 13), production (tracks 10, 12 and 13), songwriting (tracks 12 and 13)
- Peter Rauhofer – additional production (track 1), remix production (track 1)
- Keith Scott – songwriting (track 11)
- Guy Sigsworth – production (tracks 7, 9 and 14)
- Shep Solomon – production (track 3), songwriting (track 3)
- Britney Spears – songwriting (tracks 2, 3, 6–9 and 14), vocals (all tracks)
- Annette Stamatelatos – songwriting (track 7)
- David Stamm – A&R, arrangement (track 8)
- Christopher "Tricky" Stewart – production (track 2), songwriting (tracks 2 and 8), vocal arrangement (track 8), vocal production (track 8)
- Jeff Taylor – additional production (track 13), remix production (track 13)
- Mark Taylor – additional production (track 13), production (tracks 4 and 6), remix production (track 13), songwriting (track 6)
- Shania Twain – songwriting (track 11)
- Valentin – additional production (track 7), remix production (track 7)

== Charts ==
=== Weekly charts ===
Weekly chart performance for B in the Mix: The Remixes
Chart (2005)	Peak position
Belgian Albums (Ultratop Wallonia)	99
Italian Albums (FIMI)	59
Japanese Albums (Oricon)	25
US Billboard 200	134
US Top Dance Albums (Billboard)	4

=== Year-end charts ===
Year-end chart performance for B in the Mix: The Remixes
Chart (2006)	Position
US Top Dance/Electronic Albums (Billboard)	10

== Release history ==
Release dates and formats for B in the Mix: The Remixes
Region	Date	Edition(s)	Format(s)	Label(s)	Ref.
United States	November 22, 2005	Standard	CD	Jive	
United States	November 22, 2005	Deluxe	Digital download	Jive	
Italy	November 25, 2005	Standard	CD	Sony BMG	
France	November 28, 2005	Standard	CD	Epic	
Japan	November 30, 2005	Standard	CD	BMG Japan	
Australia	December 5, 2005	Standard	CD	Sony BMG	

== See also ==
- B in the Mix: The Remixes Vol. 2
- Britney Spears discography
