= Sterns Nightclub =

Nightclub in Worthing, West Sussex, England

Coordinates: 50°49′32.96″N 0°26′33.19″W

Sterns
- The Mansion House
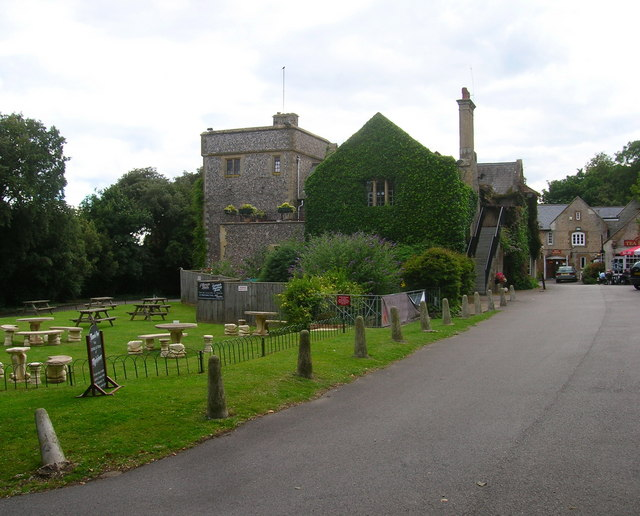
- The former Sterns Nightclub, now Highdown Towers
- Interactive map of Sterns
- Location: Highdown Hill, Worthing, England
- Capacity: 900
- Events: Rave music, Dance music

Construction
- Opened: 1990
- Closed: 1993 (as Sterns); 1998 (as Mansion House)

Sterns was a nightclub located at Highdown Towers on Highdown Hill in Worthing, West Sussex. It was situated off the A259 road just north of Ferring on the South Downs. It became known as a major centre of UK rave culture in the south of England during the late 1980s and early 1990s. It was a rare example of an early UK club boasting 4 separate rooms with DJs playing house, breakbeat hardcore, jungle music, techno, progressive house and hard house.

Although Sterns had played such music before and was a forerunner in underground parties, the most famous club nights were started in 1991 by a promoter named In-ter-dance run by the late Mensa. Such was the club nights' reputation that it was credited by a number of artists on their record sleeves, was one of the most well known Rave/House & Hardcore clubs in Europe and was regularly visited by clubbers from all over the UK.

== The building ==
Sterns was located in a picturesque old mansion on the southern slopes of the South Downs. It was also known as "The House on the Hill". The building was based on three floors and had a number of rooms, the "Top Floor", "Garage Club" & "Underground" each playing different genres of electronic music.

The main room was called the "Underground", complete with signs in the style of the London Underground logo. This was entered via 2 sets of downwards steps, with the Garage Club in between sets of steps. The Underground was located at the lowest level of the building partially embedded in the hillside in a large concrete bunker. It contained a 30 kW sound system. The underground had an array of lighting including a smoke machine, UV and a Laser.

On busy nights, it was common for condensation generated from body heat and sweat to collect on the ceiling of the underground room and drip down onto the dancers towards the end of the night. This became known as 'Sterns Rain'.

Other rooms included the Garage room. This had car hub caps on the walls and the DJ's decks were located in the front end of a VW Beetle which had been chopped in half. It also had a chill out room and small cinema located on the first floor where ambient music was played. The club had an outdoor section with a tea room and seating. There was also the "Top Floor" just after the main entrance where there was another DJ playing and a bar area.

After the club closed down in 1993, but re-opened as The Mansion House until 1998 when it was closed again and later became Highdown Towers, a hotel, with attached carvery restaurant and bar, with an external children's play area.

== The nights ==
Sterns held regular weekend events. Some started at approx 8.00 p.m. and lasted until approx 2.00 a.m., usually on a Friday. All-nighters were held fortnightly on a Saturday and started at 9.00 p.m. and lasted through until 6.00 or 7.00 a.m.

To attend all-nighters you had to sign up for membership of In-ter-dance. At its peak in 1992 In-ter-dance had 25,000 members.

Often the party would continue well after the club closed in the adjacent car park where club goers' cars fitted with sound systems would provide the music.

Sterns produced a monthly news magazine in 1993.

On 28 and 29 November 2008 the first Sterns Reunion took place.

== DJs and acts ==
The range and variety of DJs and performers that have played at Sterns is a testament to its place in Rave and Hardcore folklore.

- 100Hz
- Aubury
- Carl Cox
- Chalk E White
- Colin Dale
- Colin Faver
- DJ Asbo
- DJ Lomas
- DJ Rap
- DJ Kaos
- DJ Rody
- DJ Rules
- DJ Slipmatt
- Dr. S. Gachet
- Druid
- Easy B
- Eddie Richards
- Ellis Dee
- Fabio
- Femi B
- Frankie Valentine
- Grooverider
- Harvey bailey
- Hector C
- HMS
- House Junkie
- John 00 Fleming
- John Digweed
- Jack Master O
- Kenny Ken
- Kevin Saunderson
- Lenny Dee
- Loftgroover
- Luke Slater
- LTJ Bukem
- Michael Loafer
- Mickey Finn
- Micky T
- Moby
- Mr C (The Shamen)
- Mr Skunk and Blind Fury
- Mrs Wood
- Nick Fiorucci
- Phantasy
- Pig Bag
- Rat Pack
- Ray Keith
- Razz
- Rhythm Doctor
- Ronnie Biggs
- Sasha
- Skippy T
- Smokin Jo
- Smudge
- Stu Allan
- Terry Francis
- The Prodigy
- Top Buzz
- Vinylgroover
- Waxman
- MC Ice
- MC Motivator
- MC Stompy Don
- MC UV

MC Jester (Colin Evans RIP 2026)

== Flyers ==
In-ter-dance advertised its regular events at Sterns Nightclub with flyers. There was a very large range of flyers produced and often they parodied well-known brands or popular culture of the time, such as Holsten Brewery, Swan Vestas, Marmite, Benson & Hedges, Perrier mineral water and the Blockbusters quiz game show with its tag line "I'd like an E please Bob!".

Further information on Flyers:

The early Sterns flyers were printed by Selsey Press Limited, These flyers were usually A5 sized, brightly coloured, double sided handouts, printed on a 170GSM gloss paper used to promote the coming month's dance events. The specification of the flyer was very important, as they often found their way into the hands of people needing a "roach".

There were 20,000 of each design produced and usually four different designs were printed, on one B1 sheet, at a time, to help reduce costs.

In late 1990, through a chance meeting, at Chaffinches Farm, Birdham, West Sussex ("The Farm" was the home of In-ter-dance, in the early days), between "Jamie 2K" & Mensa, a deal was struck to produce a new format two Colour Members Newsletter, shortly after this Jamie 2K started to print the In-ter-dance Flyer's, through his then company Power Leaflets/ renamed in 2013 to Get Fruity) .

A large number of designs for the flyers were created by Tony Ladd and David Jackson of Vivid Visual Communications, although there were regular contributions from members; who designed a flyer and sent it to Mensa asking if he would use it on a Sterns flyer. There were also competitions for flyer designs.

Jamie 2K was even responsible for several of the designs, "Raving Mad" & " A Chance to Dance" were his regular contributions, for the Under 18's events.

He also designed personally the "Hole Sterns Pils" flyer which closely resembled the design of a "Holsten Pills" can... This flyer and all the material used to produce it had to be destroyed; as the brand owner of Holsten threatened court action if their request was not complied with.
