= Britney & Kevin: Chaotic (album) =

2005 video album by Britney Spears

Video / EP by Britney Spears
- Released: September 27, 2005
- Recorded: 2004–2005
- Studios: Battery (New York); Conway (Los Angeles); Frou Frou Central (London); Murlyn (Stockholm)
- Genre: Pop
- Length: 2:39:12
- Label: Jive
- Directors: Michael Haussman; Britney Spears; Bille Woodruff; Anthony E. Zuiker
- Producers: Bloodshy & Avant; Guy Sigsworth

Britney Spears chronology
Greatest Hits: My Prerogative (2004)	Britney & Kevin: Chaotic (2005)	B in the Mix: The Remixes (2005)

Singles from Britney & Kevin: Chaotic
- 1. "Someday (I Will Understand)" Released: August 18, 2005

Britney & Kevin: Chaotic is the eighth video album and second extended play (EP) by American singer Britney Spears. It was released on September 27, 2005, by Jive Records. The album serves as the home video release of Spears' UPN reality television series Britney and Kevin: Chaotic (2005), alongside two music videos and the CD featuring three previously unreleased tracks.

Britney & Kevin: Chaotic was not a commercial success, solely charting in Japan, at number 40. It produced one single, "Someday (I Will Understand)", which reached the top 10 in several European countries.

== Background and recording ==
In April 2004, MTV News reported that Britney Spears was planning a reality television series documenting her backstage life during the European leg of her fifth concert tour, The Onyx Hotel Tour, in support of her fourth studio album In the Zone (2003). Pitched as OnTourage, footage from the six-week leg was to be compiled into a six-episode series, with each episode selling for an estimated $1 million, "much more than most reality programs". Spears was to narrate and shoot footage of her with her dancers and crew. The series was planned to be completed by summer. However, Spears injured her knee while filming the music video for her single "Outrageous" in June, which forced her to cancel the remainder of The Onyx Hotel Tour.

In July 2004, Spears announced her engagement to American dancer Kevin Federline, whom she had met three months before. The romance received intense attention from the media, since Federline had recently broken up with actress Shar Jackson, who was still pregnant with their second child at the time. Spears and Federline held a wedding ceremony on September 18, 2004, but were not legally married until three weeks later on October 6 due to a delay finalizing the couple's prenuptial agreement. In October, Spears announced she would be taking a career break to start a family.

On December 30, Spears made a surprise appearance at the Los Angeles radio station KIIS-FM to premiere a rough mix of a new mid-tempo track "Mona Lisa". Spears had recorded the song live with her band during The Onyx Hotel Tour. She dedicated the song to all the "legends and icons out there". The lyrics lament the fall of Mona Lisa, calling her "unforgettable" and "unpredictable", and caution listeners not to have a "breakdown". She also revealed she wanted the song to be the lead single from her fifth studio album, tentatively titled The Original Doll and hoped to release the album "probably before summertime [2005], or maybe a little sooner than that". In January 2005, Spears posted another letter on her website, stating:

I think I should rephrase myself from my previous letters when I was talking about taking a 'break'. What I meant was I am taking a break from being told what to do. ... It's cool when you look at someone and don't know whether they are at work or play since it's all the same to them. The things I've been doing for work lately have been so much fun, because it's not like work to me anymore. I've been even more 'hands on' in my management and the business side of things, and I feel more in control than ever.

A representative for Jive Records stated that although Spears was working in the studio, no album was scheduled at the time, and that there were no plans to service "Mona Lisa" to radio. (Note: Her fifth studio album would be re-recorded and titled Blackout. It was released on October 25, 2007.)

Footage filmed for OnTourage was used for a new reality television series, titled Britney and Kevin: Chaotic. The series documented initial stages of Spears and Federline's relationship, as well as their wedding in the series finale. Britney and Kevin: Chaotic aired on UPN from May 17 until June 14, 2005, to a negative critical reception and moderate viewership.

Spears composed "Someday (I Will Understand)" on the piano at her house, two weeks before she learned of her pregnancy with her first child, Sean Preston. She explained the song came "like a prophecy... when you're pregnant, you're empowered". Guy Sigsworth produced "Someday (I Will Understand)", and also co-wrote "Over to You Now" with Imogen Heap, Robyn and Alexander Kronlund; the latter was included as a bonus track on the UK and Japanese editions of the Chaotic EP.

== Marketing ==
Britney & Kevin: Chaotic was released as a DVD+CD set on September 27, 2005, by Jive Records. The DVD, which serves as the home video release for its parent television series, includes all of its five episodes, alongside music videos for "Do Somethin'"—which had been released as a single from Spears' first greatest hits album Greatest Hits: My Prerogative (2004)—and "Someday (I Will Understand)". The CD includes "Chaotic", which was used as the opening theme for Britney and Kevin: Chaotic, "Someday (I Will Understand)", and "Mona Lisa". The three tracks were also simultaneously made available for digital consumption as a standalone EP. Though he panned its parent series, Aaron Beierle of DVD Talk complimented the video album's technical qualities.

In Japan, the EP was released separately from the home video. The former was titled Someday (I Will Understand) and was released on September 21, 2005, simultaneously serving as the maxi single for the song of the same title. "Someday (I Will Understand)" was released as the only single from Britney & Kevin: Chaotic in Europe on August 18, 2005. It reached the top 10 in Denmark, Sweden, Switzerland and Greece. The song's accompanying black-and-white music video premiered on the finale of Britney & Kevin: Chaotic. Directed by Michael Haussman, it features a pregnant Spears inside an elaborate mansion. The Hi-Bias Signature Radio Remix of the song was included on international pressings of Chaotic and subsequently on Spears' first remix album B in the Mix: The Remixes in November 2005.

== Track listing ==
Britney & Kevin: Chaotic... the DVD
No.	Title	Director(s)	Length
1.	"Can You Handle My Truth"	Anthony E. Zuiker	35:20
2.	"Who Said Anything About Love"	Zuiker	19:49
3.	"...Scared to Love You"	Zuiker	18:42
4.	"Magic Happens"	Zuiker	18:46
5.	"Veil of Secrecy"	Zuiker	42:06
6.	"Someday (I Will Understand)" (making of)	Michael Haussman	6:29
7.	"Someday (I Will Understand)" (music video)	Haussman	3:50
8.	"Do Somethin'" (music video)	Bille Woodruff; Britney Spears^{[a]}	3:32
Total length:			2:28:34

Britney & Kevin: Chaotic... the Bonus CD (Note: On digital platforms, only Britney & Kevin: Chaotic... the Bonus CD was released.)
No.	Title	Writer(s)	Producer(s)	Length
1.	"Chaotic"	Christian Karlsson; Pontus Winnberg; Henrik Jonback; Michelle Bell	Bloodshy & Avant	3:33
2.	"Someday (I Will Understand)"	Spears	Guy Sigsworth	3:38
3.	"Mona Lisa"	Spears; Teddy Campbell; David Kochanski	Bloodshy & Avant	3:27
Total length:				10:38

Britney & Kevin: Chaotic... the Bonus CD – International edition
No.	Title	Producer(s)	Length
4.	"Someday (I Will Understand)" (Hi-Bias Signature Radio Remix)	Sigsworth; Nick Fiorucci^{[b]}; Taras Harkavyi^{[b]}	3:46
Total length:			14:24

Britney & Kevin: Chaotic... the Bonus CD – UK and Japanese edition
No.	Title	Writer(s)	Producer(s)	Length
4.	"Over to You Now"	Sigsworth; Imogen Heap; Robin Carlsson; Alexander Kronlund	Sigsworth	3:42
5.	"Someday (I Will Understand)" (Hi-Bias Signature Radio Remix)	Spears	Sigsworth; Fiorucci^{[b]}; Harkavyi^{[b]}	3:46
Total length:				18:06

Notes

- ^{^a} signifies an uncredited director
- ^{^b} signifies an additional producer

== Personnel ==
Credits are adapted from the liner notes of Britney & Kevin: Chaotic.

- Stephanie Alexander – background vocals
- Michelle Bell – background vocals
- Gromyko Collins – background vocals
- Fausto Cuevas – percussion
- Dan Dymtrow – video production
- Per Eklund – drums
- Kevin Federline – executive video production
- Niklas Flyckt – drum engineering, mixing
- Emma Holmgren – background vocals
- Henrik Jonback – bass, guitar
- Grant "Mr. Blues" Jones – video editing
- William Knight – video editing
- Thomas Lindberg – bass
- Steve Lunt – A&R, arrangement
- Ben Mauro – guitar
- Charles McCrorey – engineering assistance
- Sean McGhee – engineering, mixing, programming
- Billy Murphy – video editing
- Francesco Perlangeli – assistance
- Guy Sigsworth – instrumentation, production
- Tom Soares – engineering
- Britney Spears – executive video production, piano, video direction, vocals
- Steven Wolf – drums
- Bille Woodruff – video direction

== Charts ==
Weekly chart performance for Britney & Kevin: Chaotic (Note: DVD only)
Chart (2005)	Peak position
Japanese Music DVD (Oricon)	40

== Release history ==
Release dates and formats for Britney & Kevin: Chaotic
Region	Date	Format(s)	Label(s)	Ref.
Japan	September 21, 2005	CD (Note: In Japan, Britney & Kevin: Chaotic was titled Someday (I Will Understand) and acted as both the standalone EP and the maxi single release for "Someday (I Will Understand)".)	BMG Japan	
United States	September 27, 2005	Digital download; DVD+CD	Jive	
France	October 17, 2005	DVD+CD	Jive	
Japan	October 26, 2005	DVD	BMG Japan	
United Kingdom	October 31, 2005	DVD+CD	Jive	
Australia	November 13, 2005	DVD+CD	Sony BMG	
