= Nick Fiorucci =

- Also known as: DJ's Rule, Groove Sector, Hi-Bias, Oval Emotion, Polarbabies, Soup, Syndicate 305, Temperance, Landlord, Nick Fierce, Temperance, Too Taboo
- Born: Nick Fiorucci; Toronto, Ontario, Canada
- Genres: House, Deep House, EDM
- Occupations: DJ, producer, remixer, musician
- Years active: 1988–present
- Labels: Hi-Bias Records, Universal, Sony, Warner, Arista, Jive, BMG, Curb, Maverick, Capitol, EMI, Armada, Ministry of Sound
- Website: nickfiorucci.com

Nick Fiorucci is a Canadian electronic and dance music DJ, songwriter, remixer, producer, and founder of record label Hi-Bias Records, and founder of ZIPDJ, subscription-based digital music pool. Fiorucci has done production and remix work for artists, including Britney Spears, Katy Perry, Celine Dion, Sam Smith, TLC, Eiffel 65, Laura Pausini, ATB and Michelle Branch. In 1999, Nick was the youngest person introduced into the Canadian Dance Music Hall of Fame.

Fiorucci is the acting Chairman of the Juno Award Dance Music committee for Canadian Academy of Recording Arts and Sciences.

== Education ==
Fiorucci graduated from Trebas Institute, with an Audio Engineer Diploma in the recording arts and sciences.

== Career ==
Fiorucci began his career as a DJ in the 1980s and started his own record labels Big Shot Records in 1988 and Hi-Bias Records in 1990. By the late 1990s, he became one of the prominent after mixers and producers of electronic dance music.

Fiorucci was a part of the group called Temperance from mid-1997, after Mark Ryan parted ways with the group, after launching a music production imprint titled 22 Green, he became the songwriter and producer of Temperance.

As a DJ, Fiorucci has appeared in clubs such as Sterns, Empire, Ministry of Sound, and has done opening performances for acts such as New Order, among others. He opened Lobby, a restaurant with Reza Abedi in Toronto.

== Discography ==
=== Studio albums ===
Title	Year	Label	Notes
11:11	2007	Hi-Bias Records Inc.	

=== Singles ===
Artist	Title	Label	Year	Notes
Nick Fiorucci, Luca Debonaire	"I've Got To"	Hi-Bias Records	2017	
Nick Fiorucci, Luca Debonaire	"Luca Debonaire"	Hi-Bias Records	2017	
Nick Fiorucci	"This Is House"	Hi-Bias Records	2017	
Nick Fiorucci	"Erase You"	Hi-Bias Records	2016	
Nick Fiorucci	"Closer"	Hi-Bias Records	2016	
Nick Fiorucci, Benny Camaro, Chris Marina	"Smalltown Boy"	Hi-Bias Records	2016	
Nick Fiorucci, Hardcopy	"Release Me"	Hi-Bias Records	2016	
Nick Fiorucci, Fizza	"Get Wet"	Hi-Bias Records	2016	
Nick Fiorucci, Etienne Ozborne	"I Need Your Love"	Nervous	2016	
Nick Fiorucci featuring Joee	"Bizarre Love Triangle"	No Definition	2016	
Nick Fiorucci, Saint Tropez Caps	"Make It Hot"	Hi-Bias Records	2016	
Nick Fiorucci, Fizza	"Pizazz"	Hi-Bias Records	2016	
Nick Fiorucci, Dinamo Azari	"Hacienda"	The Vinyl Factory	2016	
Nick Fiorucci [feat. Jaicko Lawrence]	"Some Kinda Way"	Hi-Bias	2015	
Nick Fiorucci ft. Jack Lawrence	"Don't Mean Nothing" (ft. Saint Tropez Caps)	Pornostar	2015	
Nick Fiorucci	"Together Forever"	Hi-Bias	2015	
Nick Fiorucci, Luca Debonaire	"Catch The Wave"	Hi-Bias	2015	
Sam Smith	"Like I Can"	Capitol	2014	
Nick Fiorucci & Luca Debonaire	"Don't Hide Your Love"	Tazmania	2015	
Nick Fiorucci	"Get Down"	BeLove	2015	
Nick Fiorucci	"You Feel Alright"	Jango	2015	
Nick Fiorucci & Luca Debonaire	"It's My Sound"	Hi-Bias	2015	
Nick Fiorucci	"Wishing"	Hi-Bias Play	2015	
Nick Fiorucci & Luca Debonaire	"Get Up!"	Hi-Bias	2015	
Nick Fiorucci & Block & Crown	"Waiting For Me"	Hi-Bias	2015	
Nick Fiorucci	"Keep Pushin' On"	Hi-Bias	2015	
Nick Fiorucci, Luca Debonaire, Matt Auston	"Bang!"	Hi-Bias	2015	
Nick Fiorucci & Luca Debonaire	"Don't Wanna Lose It"	Hi-Bias	2015	
Nick Fiorucci	"Give Me Love"	Hi-Bias	2014	
Nick Fiorucci, Luca Debonaire	"Leprechaun"	Zulu	2014	
Nick Fiorucci	"Lesson"	Hi-Bias	2014	
Nick Fiorucci & Block & Crown	"It's Really Over Now"	Hi-Bias	2014	
Nick Fiorucci	"Gotta Hold You"	Hi-Bias	2014	
Nick Fiorucci	"Techussion"	Hi-Bias	2014	
Nick Fiorucci & Block & Crown	"Understand This Groove"	Hi-Bias	2014	
Nick Fiorucci	"Warning"	Tactical	2014	
Nick Fiorucci & Block & Crown	"Refined"	Hi-Bias	2014	
Nick Fiorucci	"Beggin'"	Hi-Bias	2014	
Nick Fiorucci & Adrian Block	"I Don't Know What I'd Do"	Hi-Bias	2014	
Nick Fiorucci	"You Know What I Mean?"	Hi-Bias	2014	
Katy Perry	"Unconditionally"	Capitol/Universal (USA]	2013	
Nick Fiorucci featuring Lady Lago	"Ca$hback"	Hi-Bias Records	2013	
Nick Fiorucci featuring Lady Lago	"Take Your Cares Away"	Hi-Bias Records	2013	
Nick Fiorucci featuring Lady Lago	"What Love Is This?"	Hi-Bias Records	2013	
SOUP	"New York-London"	Hi-Bias Records	2013	
Antoine Gratton	"Dodging Teardrops"	FrostByte Media Inc.	2013	
Nick Fiorucci featuring Anthony Covatta	"Here Without You"	Hi-Bias Records	2012	
Nick Fiorucci featuring Shobha and Joshua J	"Back to Me"	Hi-Bias Records	2012	
Nick Fiorucci featuring Deko-Ze	"Rise Up"	Hi-Bias Records	2011	
Britney Spears	"Someday (I Will Understand)"	Jive	2005	
Britney Spears	"Everytime"	Jive	2003	
Keshia Chanté	"Bad Boy"	BMG/Vik(Can)	2003	
Michelle Branch	"Breathe"	Maverick	2003	
Elvis Presley	"Rubberneckin'"	BMG	2003	
Celine Dion	"I Drove All Night"	Sony	2003	
Justin Timberlake	"Cry Me a River"	Sony	2002	
Whitney Houston	"One of Those Days"	Arista	2002	
ATB	"Hold You"	Popular/EMI	2002	
Jennifer Lopez	"Jenny from the Block"	Sony	2001	
Shania Twain	"Hate to Love"	Universal	2000	
TLC	"No Scrubs"	LaFace/BMG	2000	

=== Awards and recognitions ===
In 1994, Fiorucci won Juno Award for Dance Recording of the Year for Red Light's (Miguel Graça and Robert Ouimet's) song named "Thankful". In November 1998, he received a No. 1 plaque awarded by Society of Composers, Authors and Music Publishers of Canada at The Left Bank in Toronto.

In 2004, as an artist and producer, he won Urban Music Awards in the category "Dance Electronic Recording of The Year" for the song named "Make You Love Me", done together with Carlo Coppola. In 2008, he was nominated for Juno Award for his song "Every Time You Move". In 2018, he won Juno Award for his "Closer ft. Laurell".

Year	Awards ceremony	Award description(s)	Results
1993	Juno Awards	Best Dance Recording	Nominated
1994	Juno Awards	Best Dance Recording	Won
1995	Juno Awards	Best Dance Recording	Nominated
1995	Juno Awards	Best Dance Recording	Nominated
1996	Juno Awards	Best Dance Recording	Nominated
1997	Juno Awards	Best Dance Recording	Nominated
1998	Juno Awards	Best Dance Recording	Nominated
1999	Juno Awards	Best Dance Recording	Nominated
2000	Juno Awards	Best Dance Recording	Nominated
2001	Juno Awards	Best Dance Recording	Nominated
2004	Juno Awards	Dance Recording of the Year	Nominated
2004	Urban Music Award	Dance Electronic Recording of The Year	Nominated
2006	Juno Awards	Dance Recording of the Year	Nominated
2007	Juno Awards	Dance Recording of the Year	Nominated
2008	Juno Awards	Dance Recording of the Year	Nominated
2018	Juno Awards	Dance Recording of the Year	Won

== See also ==
- List of electronic musicians
