= Hasmik Karapetyan =

Armenian pop singer (born 1977)

Hasmik Karapetyan (Kirmizian) Հասմիկ Կարապետյան (Քրմզեան) Jasmina Ջասմինա
- Born: July 4, 1977 (age 48); Yerevan, Armenian SSR, Soviet Union
- Genres: Pop
- Occupations: Singer, songwriter, pianist
- Instrument: Vocals
- Years active: 1995–present
- Website: www.facebook.com/HasmikOfficial/

Hasmik Artashesi Karapetyan (Armenian: Հասմիկ Արտաշեսի Կարապետյան; born 4 July 1977) is an Armenian, stage name or pseudonym: Jasmina (since 02/22/2026).[1]) (Armenian: Ջասմինա) - pop singer.

== Career ==
Hasmik started singing at a young age and composed some songs at the age of 13. Her debut song was in 1995 at the "Bohem" festival, where she presented her song "Garun" (meaning Spring in Armenian). Between 1995 and 1997, she worked in the Ardzaganq Studios as a soloist and a musician, recording six songs and had concerts throughout Armenia. From 1997 to 1999, she worked in the State Song Theatre as a soloist and actress, and participated in music shows.

In 2000, she recorded her first CD called Rain (Armenian: Անձրև/Անձրեւ, romanized: Andzrev), featuring mostly techno and pop songs. From 2000 to 2001, her best known music videos were "Yes gnum em", "Ays bemum", "Andzrev", "Hogis" and "From evil to good". In 2004, she released her second album Strange World, followed in 2005 by My Soul, an album featuring Hasmik's hits. In 2009, her single and music video for "Kraki par" was released. Her fourth album was in 2010 with Fullmoon (Armenian: Լիալուսին, romanized: Lialusin) and the accompanying music video "Qo Siro Dimac". She also performed three concerts at the State Song Theatre in April 2010. All throughout her career, she made tours to many centers of the Armenian diaspora in Europe (Amsterdam, Antwerp, Prague, Stockholm, Barcelona, London, Athens, Moscow), and the Middle East (Damascus, Tehran). In June 2011, Armenian Radio featured her as "Artist of the Month". One of Hasmik's most famous songs was a duet with DerHova titled "Anhnare" (Անհնարը).

== Personal life ==
Hasmik Karapetyan graduated from No. 122 secondary school while also attending classes in music school. After graduation, she studied at Yerevan State Conservatory named after Komitas in the conservatory's Vocal Department. She also studied Journalism for 3 years at Gladzor University, but had to leave prior to graduation because of immigration to the United States.

She was engaged to the Armenian singer Hayko, but they separated in 2002. Hasmik was engaged, in 2014, to Shant Kirmizian an Armenian-American who is a DJ, singer, producer, and businessman primarily involved in mechanical engineering. He is also known by his stage name, SOUNDKODE. They currently live together in Yerevan, Armenia. On 6 July 2015, Hasmik and Shant were married and now have two children, Datev and Grigor.

== Discography ==
- Rain (2000)
- Strange World (2004)
- My Soul (2005)
- Fullmoon (2010)

== Awards and nominations ==
- 2004: Nominated for "Best Female Singer" in Moscow
- 2006: Acknowledgement for "Best Female Singer" at the "National Music Competition"
- 2007: Nominations for "Best Song", "Best Music Video" and "Best Album" awards
- 2012: Acknowledgement for "Best Duet Song" for the song "Anhnare" with DerHova at the "Dar21 Music Awards"
