= ZIPDJ =

Canadian digital music pool

- Company type: Private
- Available in: English
- Founded: 2007
- Headquarters: Toronto, Canada
- Area served: Worldwide
- Industry: Music
- Products: Promotional recordings
- Website: www.zipdj.com
- Current status: Active

ZIPDJ is an online subscription-based digital music pool founded in 2007, which distributes promotional releases to professional club, commercial radio, online radio, and campus/college radio DJs, and other music industry professionals. Since 2009, ZIPDJ has been a sponsor of the CDJ Show presented by Pioneer DJ.

== History ==
ZIPDJ is a spin-off of Musicab, which was in operation in Canada since November 2001. MusicCab was created for use by the Canadian major record labels for the purpose of cost-effective distribution of digital promotional music, due to the rise of digital music and the diminishing traditional physical product record pools.

== Services ==
ZIPDJ uses a web-based delivery system to service its members promotional music from a growing list of over 4000 major and independent record labels and digital distributors worldwide, including Universal Music, Warner, Ultra, and many others from around the world. ZIPDJ provides secure online delivery for record labels, including real-time feedback and data collection. ZIPDJ members can legally download high-quality music in MP3 format, sometimes weeks or months ahead of normal commercial release timelines.

== Awards and recognition ==
ZIPDJ is endorsed by the music industry, recognized by the Canadian Professional Disc Jockey Association (CPDJA), and the Canadian Disc Jockey Association (CDJA).

ZIPDJ is notable for compiling National Club, Dance, and Urban DJ charts for the countries of Canada and the United States, and is also used to compile the M.I.S. Global Dance Traxx Top 200 chart. These charts are electronically compiled using data from hundreds of DJs across North America.

In 2011 through 2015, ZIPDJ was nominated for the International Dance Music Award in the category "Best Record Pool/Promo Subscription Service".
