= Fantasy (fragrance) =

Perfume endorsed by Britney Spears

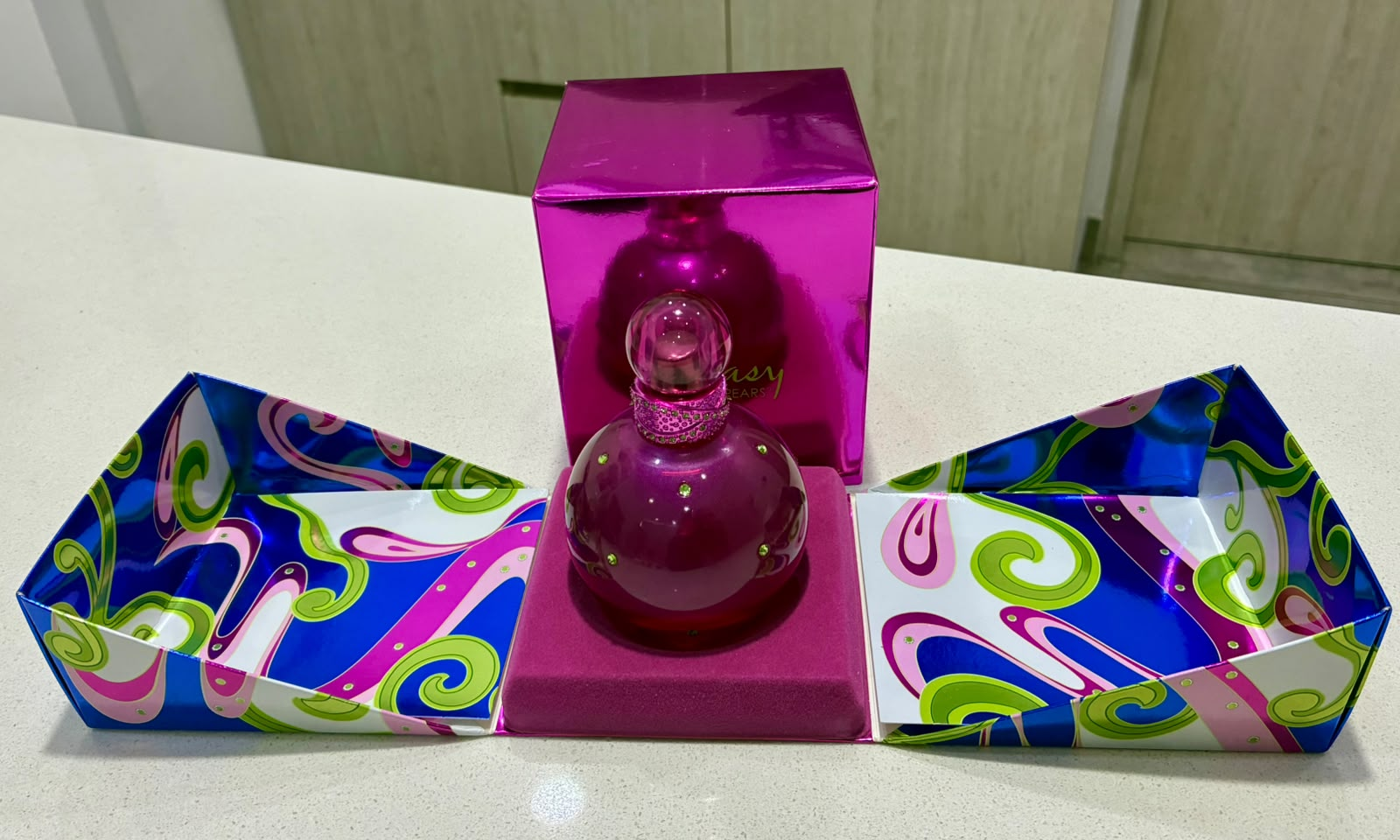

Fragrance by Britney Spears
- Released: September 15, 2005
- Label: Elizabeth Arden
- Tagline: Everybody Has One
- Successor: Believe

Fantasy is a women's fragrance by Britney Spears, developed with Elizabeth Arden and released in the United States in 2005. Created by Ann Gottlieb and Givaudan, the perfume became one of the most commercially successful celebrity fragrances of the 2000s. It topped mass-market fragrance launches in 2006, and reportedly generated more than $1.5 billion in sales worldwide.

== Background and Release ==
Following the success of Spears’ debut fragrance Curious, Elizabeth Arden announced a second perfume to launch in department stores in September 2005. Company executives described Fantasy as a more romantic and mature counterpart to Curious, which had been marketed as of youthful and spontaneous fragrance. Although primarily marketed to consumers aged 18 to 30, the brand developed a following among older demographics.

The fragrance was distributed to approximately 1,800 department stores across the United States during its initial rollout. Elizabeth Arden later expanded the international release would begin with travel retail markets in the Americas before launching in Australia, New Zealand, and Europe between late 2005 and early 2006. According to Elizabeth Arden president Paul West, Fantasy became one of the company’s strongest fragrance launches of the season in the United States and in several international markets. In its first three weeks on the market, the perfume reportedly earned more than $30 million in sales.

== Scent and Packaging ==
Fantasy was created by Ann Gottlieb and Givaudan. Its composition includes top notes of red lychee, quince, and kiwi, with middle notes of cupcake, jasmine, orchid, and white chocolate over a musky, woody base. The bottle, designed by Jean Antretter, features a fuchsia orb decorated with green Swarovski crystals and interlocking rings around the neck. Spears collaborated on the design process and selected both the rounded shape and the pink color scheme. According to Tamara Steel, Elizabeth Arden's vice president of fragrance, the crystals represented Spears' image, while the interlocking rings symbolized everlasting love.

The fragrance is housed in a folding carton designed in pink, green, and blue. Its origami-inspired construction allows the carton to open when the lid is removed, revealing the bottle inside. The packaging uses the same opening mechanism as Spears' first fragrance, Curious, but has a different color scheme and graphic design. The packaging continued the bright, jewel-inspired design introduced with Curious, while using a different palette and graphic style.

== Marketing ==
Following the commercial success of Curious, Elizabeth Arden positioned Fantasy as another major release in Britney Spears’ fragrance line. Company executives aimed to establish the perfume as one of the leading celebrity fragrances on the market while continuing to promote Curious as a strong-selling brand. The campaign included television, print, and an online marketing approach similar to the one used for Curious which generated effective costumer engagement.

Television commercials premiered alongside the fragrance launch and later returned during the holiday season, while print advertisements appeared in fashion and lifestyle magazines throughout late 2005. Industry reports estimated that the combined marketing budget for Curious and Fantasy exceeded $15 million. Photographs for the print campaign were taken by Ellen von Unwerth, Jaimie Trueblood, and 2A. Advertisements appeared in magazines including People, Allure, Cosmopolitan, Glamour, InStyle. Elizabeth Arden also launched the Fantasy Britney Spears website on September 15, featuring promotional content such as wallpapers, ringtones, and online games tied to the fragrance.

=== TV Commercial ===
The television commercial premiered online through AOL on September 15 before its broadcast debut on MTV’s Total Request Live one day later. The commercial was directed by Billy Woodruff, who had previously worked on several of Britney Spears’ music videos, in collaboration with Radical Media producer Chris Rouchard and director of photography Paul Laufer. In the advertisement, Spears is depicted as a goddess who encounters a hunter, portrayed by Nick Steele, in a forest setting. When she mentions leaving for her world tour, the hunter shoots her with a “magic love arrow,” causing her to remain with him.

=== Fantasy: Promo CD ===
Fantasy Promo CD

EP by Britney Spears
- Released: 2005
- Genres: Pop, Electronic
- Length: 8:18
- Label: Jive Records

A limited-edition promotional extended play (EP) was released alongside the fragrance. The CD included the songs Breathe on Me and And Then We Kiss, previously featured on Spears’ fourth studio album In the Zone and her remix album B in the Mix: The Remixes. The enhanced CD also contained the television commercial directed by Billy Woodruff.

==== Track listing ====
No.	Title	Writer(s)	Producer(s)	Length
1.	"Breathe on Me"	Stephen Lee; Steven Anderson; Lisa Greene	Mark Taylor	3:43
2.	"And Then We Kiss"	Britney Spears; Mark Taylor; Paul Barry	Junkie XL	4:28
3.	"Fantasy Fragrance Commercial"			0:30
Total length:				8:41

== Reception ==
Fantasy received continued attention in fragrance publications after its release and is associated with the rise of gourmand celebrity perfumes in the 2000s. Reviews frequently discussed the perfume’s combination of sweet gourmand notes with floral and musky accords. Fragrance expert Ren Reynolds described the perfume as appealing to both younger and older audiences because it combined sweet dessert notes with more traditional floral and musky notes. In an interview with Newsweek, Reynolds said consumers associated the fragrance with adolescence and early fragrance purchases.

The success of Fantasy led to several follow-up releases, including Midnight Fantasy. Reviewing the fragrance for The New York Times, Chandler Burr praised its approach to gourmand perfumery and gave it four out of five stars. Burr also highlighted perfumer Caroline Sabas’ use of fruit notes such as strawberry, raspberry, and mango in the composition.

== Flankers ==
Elizabeth Arden has released several variations of Fantasy over the years. These editions maintain the core composition of the original fragrance, preserving its base notes while introducing new top and middle notes that remain within the sweet and fruity fragrance family.

No.	Fragrance	Tagline	Perfumer	Top Notes	Middle Notes	Base Notes	Year	Ref.
1	Midnight Fantasy	"Magic Begins at Midnight"	Caroline Sabas	Plum, Sour Cherry, Raspberry	Orchid, Iris, Freesia	Vanilla, Musk, Amber	2006	
2	Hidden Fantasy	"What Do You Have to Hide?"	Rodrigo Flores-Roux	Orange, Tangerine, Lemon Verbena, Neroli	Sweet Notes, Clove, Lily, Jasmine	Vanilla, Amber, Woodsy Notes, Sandalwood	2008	
3	Circus Fantasy	"Where Nothing is What it Seems..."	Jean-Marc Chaillan	Raspberry, Sugar, Apricot	Orchid, Peony, Water Lily	Vanilla, Musk, Violet, Woody Notes	2009	
4	Island Fantasy	"What's Your Island Fantasy?"	Stephen Nilsen	Watermelon, Clementine, Mandarin Orange, Red Berries	Freesia, Violet, Jasmine	Sugar Cane, Musk	2013	
5	Fantasy: The Nice Remix	"Everybody Has One. Naughty or Nice"	Marypierre Julien, Caroline Sabas, James Krivda	Kiwi	Cupcake, Jasmine	Musk	2014	
6	Fantasy: The Naughty Remix	"Everybody Has One. Naughty or Nice"	Marypierre Julien, Caroline Sabas, James Krivda	Jasmine	White Chocolate Orchid, Cupcake	Woody Notes, Iris, Musk	2014	
7	Rocker Femme Fantasy	"Unlock Your Rock n' roll Side"	Marypierre Julien, Caroline Sabas	Whipped Cream, Coconut, Blackberry	Gardenia, Violet, Jasmine	Vanilla, Cashmere Wood, Musk, Amber	2014	
8	Fantasy The Intimate Edition	"Everybody Has an Intimate Fantasy"	Olivier Gillotin, Givaudan	Litchi, Italian Lemon, Violet Leaf	Brown sugar, Ozonic notes, Genet, Jasmine, Lily of the Valley	Vanilla, White Musk, Heliotrope, Benzoin	2015	
9	Maui Fantasy	"Aloha from Hawaii"	Caroline Sabas	Passion Fruit, Strelitzia, Pink Grapefruit	Tiare Flower, Hibiscus, Cyclamen, Orange Blossom	Coconut, Vanilla, Musk, White Amber, White Woods	2016	
10	Fantasy in Bloom	"Pure Enchantment in One Bottle"	John Gamba	Japanese Cherry Blossom, Red Berries, Green Mandarin	Jasmine, Osmanthus, Tuberose	Vanilla, Sandalwood, Amber	2017	
11	Sunset Fantasy	"Experience Summer in a Bottle"	Caroline Sabas	Italian Mandarin, Apple, Blood Grapefruit	Peach, Raspberry Leaf, Orange Blossom	Vanilla, Amber, Australian Sandalwood	2018	
12	Rainbow Fantasy	"What Color is Your Fantasy?"	Gil Clavien	Cloudberry, Pear Leaf, Finger Lime	Water Lily, Peony, Jasmine	Cotton Candy, Crystal Amber, Woody Notes	2019	
13	Glitter Fantasy	"Dare to Shine"	Caroline Sabas	Red Berries, Plum	Heliotrope, Lotus, Violet	Musk, Benzoin, Agarwood (Oud)	2020	
14	Festive Fantasy	"Life is a Fantasy"		Dewberry, Sour Cherry, Plum	Freesia, Lily, Jasmine	Sugar, Vanilla, Musk, Sandalwood	2020	
15	Fantasy Intense	"Your New Fantasy Awaits"	Olivier Gillotin	Milk Mousse, Litchi, Pear, Kiwi	White Chocolate, Cupcake, Jasmine, Orchid	Patchouli, Woodsy Notes, Musk, Orris	2021	
16	Electric Fantasy	"Electrify Your Fantasy"	Gil Clavien	Passion fruit, Mandarin Orange, Lychee, Pink Pepper	Heliotrope, Peony, Jasmine, Orange blossom	Benzoin, Ambrox, Haitian Vetiver, Patchouli	2021	
17	Fantasy Sheer	"Your Next Fantasy Awaits"	Olivier Gillotin	Citruses Water, Litchi, Quince	Water LilyM, Lily of the Valley	Cupcake, White Musk, Iris, Woodsy Notes	2021	
18	Blissful Fantasy	"Find Your Bliss"	Gil Clavien	Melon, Lily, Freesia	Tiare Flower, Tuberose, Jasmine	Musk, Sandalwood, Orris Root	2022	
19	Naked Fantasy	"Bare Your Beauty"	Olivier Gillotin	Hard Cider, Blackcurrant, Lemon	Peach, Osmanthus, Water Lily	Cupcake, Vanilla, Apricot, Musk	2022	
20	Jungle Fantasy	"Unleash Your Wildest Fantasy"	Caroline Sabas	Watermelon, Yuzu, Violet Leaf	Water Lily, Gardenia, Gustavia Flower	Cupcake, Tonka	2023	
21	Candied Fantasy	"Make Life a Little Sweeter"		Bubble Gum, Strawberry, Orange	Hibiscus, Jasmine Sambac, Lily of the Valley	Cupcake, Musk, Sandalwood	2024	
22	Fantasy Did It Again Edition	"Dare to do it Again"		Mandarin, Pear, Lily of the Valley	Rose, Lavender, Almond Cream, Milk Mousse	Musk, Sandalwood, Cherry	2025	
23	Goddess Fantasy	"Reveal the Goddess Within"		Mango, Mandarin, Bergamot	Jasmine, Orange Blossom, Turkish Rose	Vanilla, Buttercream, Benzoin, Musk	2026	
