= Rayne Fisher-Quann =

Canadian activist (born 2001)

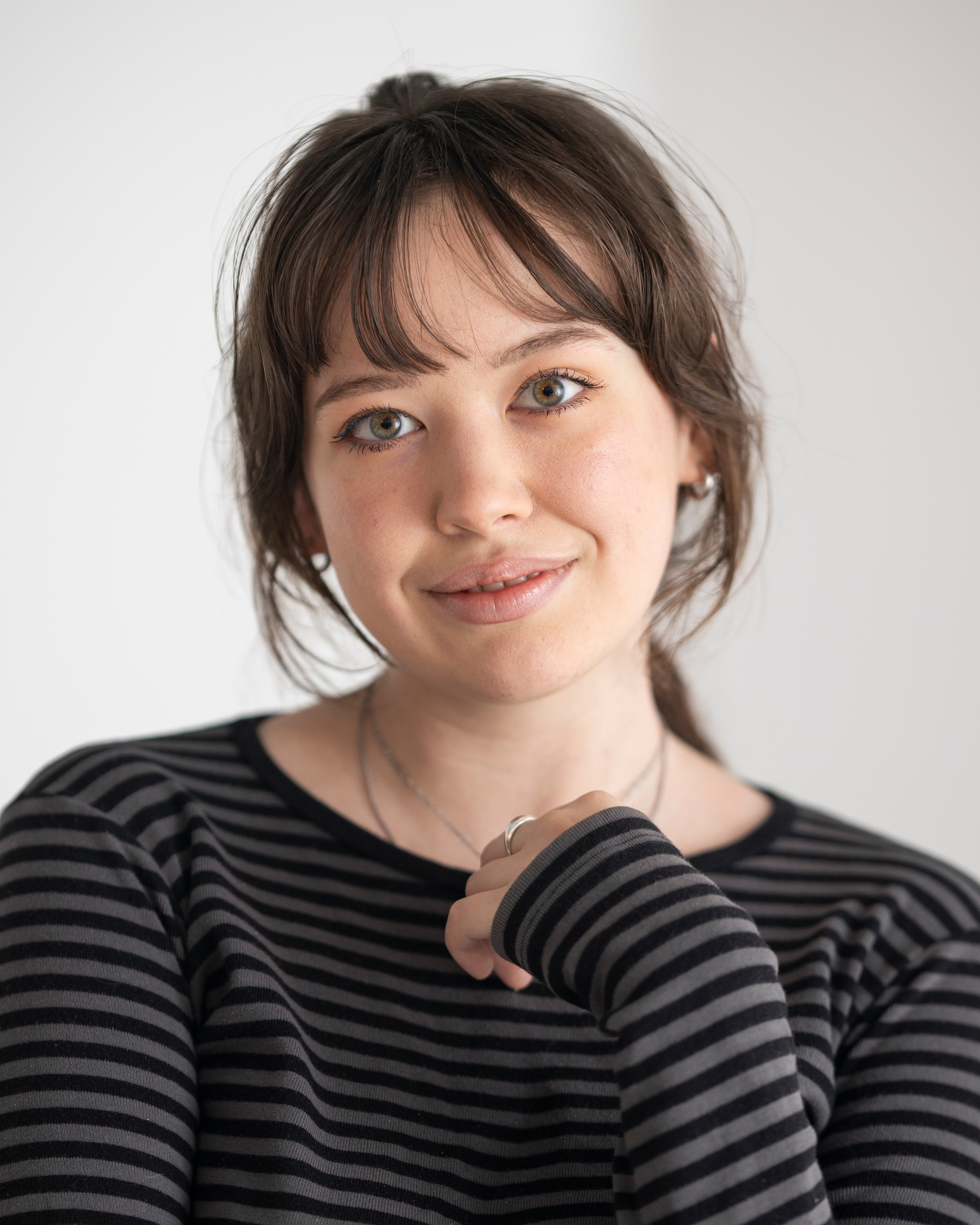
- Fisher-Quann in 2026
- Born: August 9, 2001 (age 25); Toronto, Canada
- Education: University of British Columbia
- Occupations: Writer; cultural critic
- Website: internetprincess.substack.com

Rayne Fisher-Quann (born August 9, 2001) is a Canadian writer and cultural critic.

== Activism ==
In September 2018, Fisher-Quann helped create the student organization March for Our Education in order to lead student actions to protest Premier of Ontario Doug Ford's decision to repeal the sex education content of the provincial Health and Physical Education curriculum, cancel a proposed Indigenous-focused curriculum, and enact other funding cuts to education. The first student rally took place in Queen's Park in Toronto on July 21, 2018. In September 2018, Fisher-Quann co-organized another day of action with fellow student and activist Indygo Arscott from Decolonize Our Schools. Using the hashtags #WeTheStudentsDoConsent, #StudentsSayYes, and #FreeTheStudents, students organized across social media leading to student walkouts and rallies across Ontario on September 20, 21, and 22. In April 2019, Fisher-Quann and March for Our Education helped to register schools for another province-wide student walkout against government cuts to education organized by Ontario high school student Natalie Moore.

Following the student protests, Fisher-Quann was a featured speaker at the 2019 Toronto Women's March in January 2019. She was also a keynote speaker at a UNICEF Canada youth activism summit on November 20, 2019.

== Career ==
Fisher-Quann created the Substack blog internet princess in September 2021. Fisher-Quann has also written for a number of cultural publications, including i-D and The New York Times.

Her writing has received praise and media coverage including profiles on Fisher-Quann and internet princess appearing in Vox, Slate, and Vanity Fair.

In August 2023, she announced that she would be publishing a collection of essays called Complex Female Character with Knopf.

In 2023, she gave a talk called "Girl, Online" at McGill University.

== Education ==
Fisher-Quann attended high school at William Lyon Mackenzie Collegiate Institute in Toronto, Ontario and was a student at the University of British Columbia. She lives in Williamsburg, Brooklyn.
