= David E. Bloom =

American author and academic (born 1955)

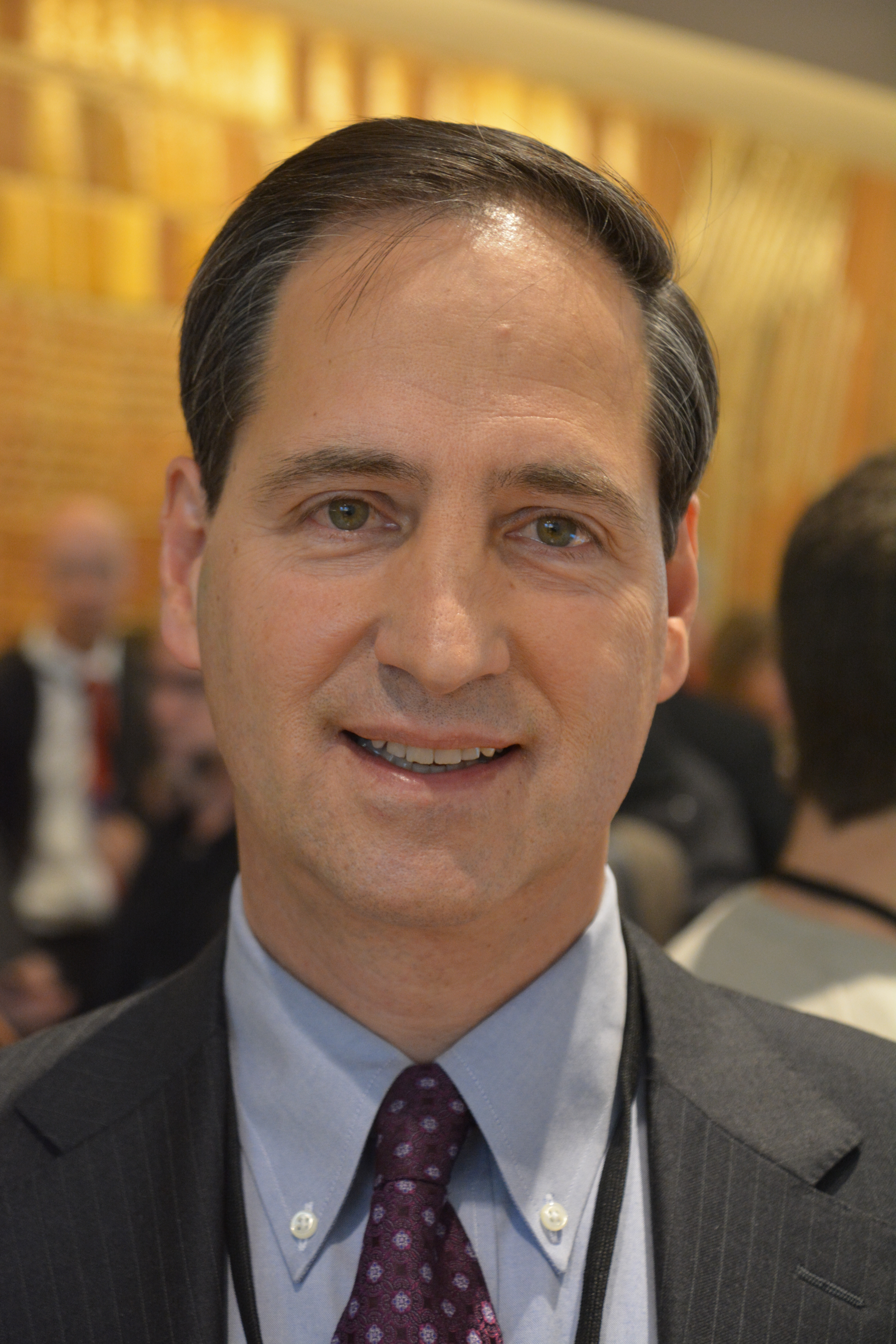
- Born: October 16, 1955 (age 71); New York City, U.S.
- Education: Cornell University; Princeton University
- Occupations: author, professor, economist, demographer

David E. Bloom (born October 16, 1955) is an American author, academic, economist, and demographer. He is a professor of Economics and Demography at the Harvard School of Public Health, and director of the Program on the Global Demography of Aging. He is widely considered as one of the greatest multidisciplinary social science researchers of the world.

Bloom has written and published over 250 articles and books focusing on health, demography, education, and labor. He has been a contributing editor of American Demographics and an associate editor of the Review of Economics and Statistics. He has also served as a referee for over 50 academic journals, and has been a member of the Board of Reviewing Editors of Science Magazine since August 1991.

He has been honored with an Alfred P. Sloan Research Fellowship and the Galbraith Award for teaching. He was also a Fulbright Scholar in India (1982–1983) and a Scholar-in-Residence at the Russell Sage Foundation (1989–1990).

== Personal background ==
Bloom was born on October 16, 1955, in New York City. He attended the New York State School of Industrial and Labor Relations, Cornell University, graduating in 1976 with a Bachelor of Science degree in Industrial and Labor Relations. In 1978, he earned his Master's degree in Economics from Princeton University and his Ph.D. in Economics and Demography from Princeton in 1981. Bloom is married to Lakshmi Reddy Bloom, with whom he has two children, including personal development books author Sahil Bloom. Sonali, who completed a BSci in Physics at Yale University and an MBA from Harvard University, and Sahil who double majored in Economics & Sociology and a Masters in Public Policy from Stanford University. Bloom is Jewish.

== Professional background ==
=== Academia ===
Throughout his career, Bloom has taught university courses at both the graduate and undergraduate levels. Primary areas of focus have included labor and development economics, global health and demographics, and statistics and econometrics. Following his graduation from Princeton, Bloom joined the public policy faculty of Carnegie Mellon University, School of Urban and Public Affairs, where he served as an assistant professor of Economics for academic years ending in 1981 and 1982.

In July 1982, he joined the staff of Harvard University, Department of Economics, where he served as an assistant professor of economics through June 1985. The following month, he served as the Paul Sack Associate Professor of Political Economy through June 1987.

Bloom began working as a professor of economics at Columbia University, Department of Economics in July 1987, where he remained through the end of the 1996 academic year. During this time, he remained as visiting professor of economics at Harvard, until March 1988. During the 1989–1990 academic year, Bloom joined the Russell Sage Foundation, where he served as the Scholar-in-Residence. He then served as the chair of the Department of Economics at Columbia from July 1990 to December 1993.

In July 1995, Bloom began serving as the acting executive director of the Harvard Institute for International Development. In July 1996, he served as the deputy director, while simultaneously serving as the director of the Education and Social Development Group, remaining there through June 1999.

Following the end of the 1996 academic year at Columbia, Bloom joined the staff of Harvard School of Public Health, where he served as the Professor of Population and Health Economics for three years, before being named the Clarence James Gamble Professor of Economics and Demography, where he has remained since June 1999. He is the chair of Harvard's Department of Global Health and Population, and director of the Program on the Global Demography of Aging. He is also a faculty research associate of the National Bureau of Economic Research, where he participates in the programs on labor studies, health economics, and aging.

=== Research interests ===
Bloom's primary areas of research include labor economics, health, demography, and the environment. He has written numerous articles, reports, and books presenting comparative studies between health status and economic growth, along with the effects of population change on economic development. He has also researched and presented the factors that determine wages, fringe benefits, and total family income. Additional focus has included:

- adjudication of labor disputes
- measurements of discrimination
- emerging world labor market
- effects of rapid population growth
- economics of municipal solid waste
- sociology and economics of marriage and fertility
- global spread and economic impacts of HIV/AIDS

=== Consulting ===
Throughout his career, Bloom has provided consulting services to several national and international organizations, including the World Bank, the World Health Organization, the United Nations Development Programme, the International Labour Organization, the National Academy of Sciences, and the Asian Development Bank. He is also a member of the American Arbitration Association's Labor Arbitration Panel.

=== Publishing ===
Bloom has written and published over 250 articles and books focusing on health, demography, education, and labor. He has been a contributing editor of American Demographics and an associate editor of the Review of Economics and Statistics. He has also served as a referee for over 50 academic journals, and has been a member of the Board of Reviewing Editors of Science Magazine since August 1991.

== Board memberships ==
Bloom is an Adjunct Trustee of amfAR, The Foundation for AIDS Research and member of the Board of Directors of Population Services International, which addresses HIV/AIDS on a global scale. He additionally serves as a member of the World Economic Forum's Global Health Advisory Board and its Global Agenda Councils on Population Growth and on Ageing. In April 2005, he was elected Fellow of the American Academy of Arts and Sciences. Along with fellow member, Joel Cohen, he serves as a co-director of an American Academy of Arts and Sciences educational project.

== Honors and awards ==
- Fulbright Scholar in India (1982–1983)
- Alfred P. Sloan Research Fellowship (1986)
- J.K. Galbraith Prize for excellence in teaching (1987)
- Russell Sage Foundation (Scholar-in-Residence 1989–1990)
- Fellow of the American Academy of Arts and Sciences (2005)
- Paul G. Rogers Society for Global Health Research Ambassador (2009)

== Published works ==
- Bloom, David E.; and Trahan, Jane T. Flexible Benefits and Employee Choice: Highlights of the Literature, Work in America Institute, 1986. ISBN 978-0080295183
- Bloom, David E.; Canning, David; and Sevilla, Jaypee. Demographic Dividend: New Perspective on Economic Consequences Population Change, Rand Publishing, 2003. ISBN 978-0833029263
- Bloom, David E.; Craig, Patricia H.; and Malaney, Pia N. The Quality of Life in Rural Asia, Asian Development Bank Press, 2001. ISBN 978-0195924541
- Prettner, Klaus; and Bloom, David E. Automation and Its Macroeconomic Consequences: Theory, Evidence, and Social Impacts, 2020. ISBN 978-0-12-818028-0
