= Michael Haussman =

American director

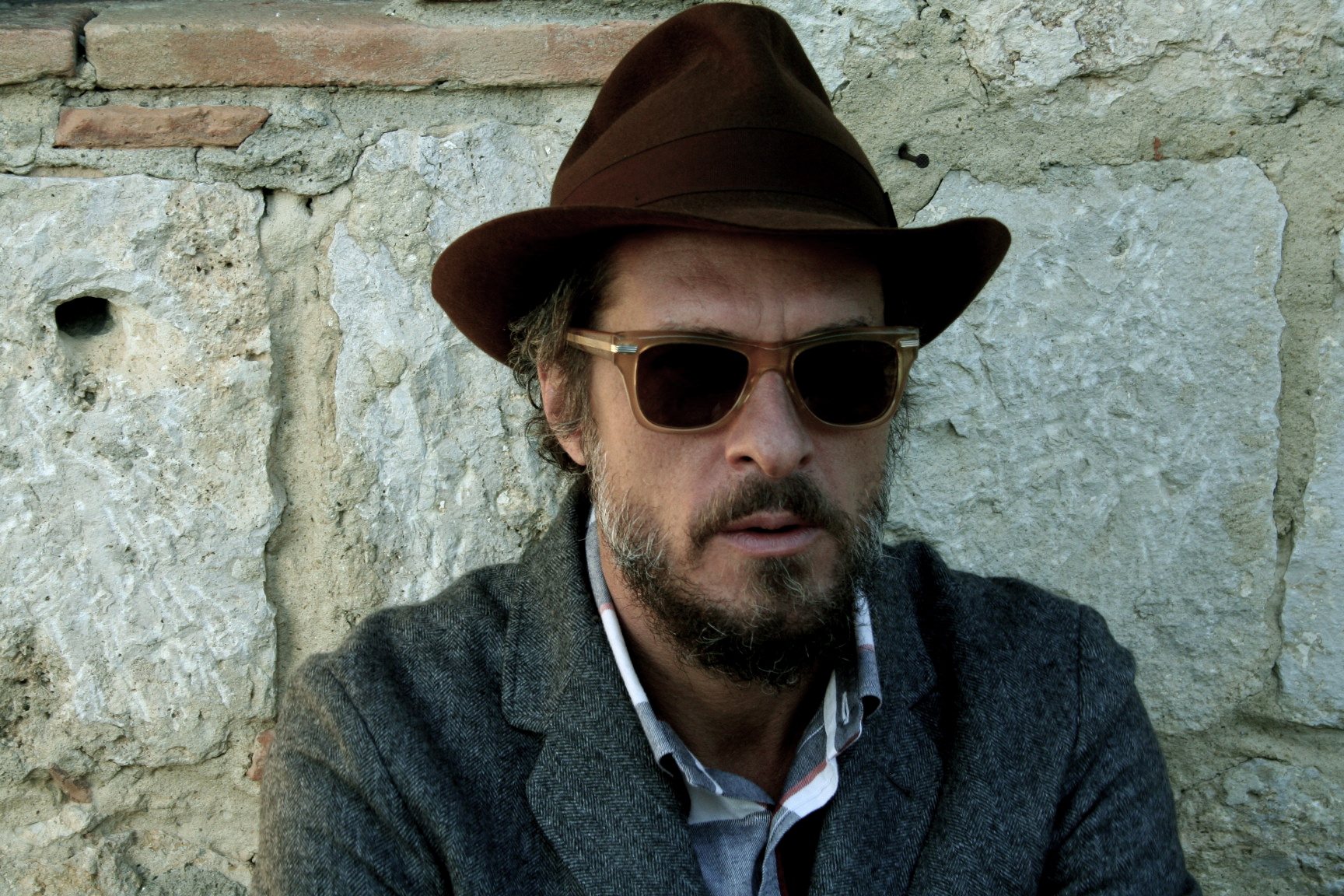
- Haussman in 2013
- Born: Michael Haussman
- Occupations: Director; Writer; Producer; Artist

Michael Haussman is an American director, writer, and artist, living in Rome, Italy.

== Career ==
Michael Haussman's music videos have won several awards, including six MTV Video Music Awards and a Museum of Modern Art Award.

Past films include: Rhinoceros Hunting In Budapest, starring Nick Cave, which premiered at the Sundance Film Festival; Blind Horizon, starring Sam Shepard; The Unsinkable Henry Morgan, which also premiered at Sundance Film Festival; and The Audition, which premiered at the Venice International Film Festival.

In 2012 Michael Haussman's most art exhibition, Gravity, premiered at Los Angeles Pacific Design Center. Gravity was presented at Berlin Art Week, courtesy of Iconoclast Galleries. It was featured in 2018 at Cannes, InOut Art Exhibition. As a painter, Haussman's solo art show Naturales, featuring large-scale matador and bull paintings (ink on paper), premiered at the Desoto gallery in Los Angeles and New York Scope Art Fair.

== Awards ==
- Best Short Film, "The Audition", Byron Bay International Film Festival
- Best Foreign Film, "The Audition", NYC Downtown Short Film Festival
- Best Dance Video, "Do It Again" by The Chemical Brothers at the MTV Video Music Award Japan
- Best Electronic Video, "Do It Again" by The Chemical Brothers at the MVPA Awards
- Best Music Video, "La Tortura" (Alejandro Sanz and Shakira), MTV Latin America Video Music Awards (see La Tortura#Accolades)
- Best Music Video by Female Artist, "Verás" (Madonna), MTV Latino Award
- Best Music Video by Female Artist, "Take a Bow" by Madonna, MTV Video Music Awards
- Excellence in Music Video "Take a Bow" by Madonna, AICP Awards Museum of Modern Art
- Best Short Film, "Abandoned 58", Berlin International Film Festival

== Filmography ==
Title	Director	Writer	Producer
Abandoned '58	Yes	Yes	No
Rhinoceros Hunting in Budapest	Yes	Yes	No
The Last Serious Thing	Yes	Yes	Yes
Blind Horizon	Yes	No	No
The Unsinkable Henry Morgan	Yes	No	No
The Audition	Yes	Yes	Yes
Edge of the World	Yes	No	No

Television

- Do Not Disturb (2019) – creator, writer, showrunner, director, producer

=== Music videos ===
- "Love... Thy Will Be Done" (Martika)
- "Night Calls" (Joe Cocker)
- "Hazard (chapter 2)" (Richard Marx)
- "Hazard (chapter 1)" (Richard Marx)
- "Can't Do a Thing (To Stop Me)" (Chris Isaak)
- "Not the Only One" (Bonnie Raitt)
- "Take a Bow" (Madonna)
- "You'll See"/"Verás" (Madonna)
- "My Love Is for Real" (Paula Abdul)
- "Riding with the King" (Eric Clapton & B. B. King)
- "Optimistique-moi" (Mylène Farmer)
- "Jesus Walks" (Kanye West)
- "Someday (I Will Understand)" (Britney Spears)
- "La Tortura" (Shakira featuring Alejandro Sanz)
- "You Know My Name" (Chris Cornell)
- "SexyBack" (Justin Timberlake featuring Timbaland)
- "Do It Again" (The Chemical Brothers)
- "Qué Hiciste" (Jennifer Lopez)
- "Singin' in the Rain" (Usher) (For CBS' "Movies Rock" TV special)
- "Brave" (Jennifer Lopez) (Unreleased)
- "Same Old Love" (Selena Gomez)
- "Your Song" (Rita Ora)

=== Making the video TV series ===
- Madonna: No Bull! The Making of "Take a Bow"
- Chris Cornell – "You Know My Name"
- Jennifer Lopez – "Qué Hiciste"
- Justin Timberlake featuring Timbaland – "SexyBack"
- Britney Spears – "Someday (I Will Understand)" – Mini Behind The Scenes
- Shakira featuring Alejandro Sanz – "La Tortura"
