= Canadian Disc Jockey Association =

Canadian not-for-profit trade association

The Canadian Disc Jockey Association (CDJA) is a not-for-profit trade association for disc jockeys across Canada. The CDJA was formed in 1976 and incorporated in 1978 to serve not only the disc jockey trade but the consumer, as well.

It is a self-regulating association and operates under a national constitution and code of ethics. Its members either belong to one of many chapters in major cities across Canada or in some cases, where there is not one nearby, they are known as "unchaptered" or National members.

The CDJA has established a code of conduct specifying the professional values and high standards that members are expected to follow. Individuals can apply for CDJA membership only after they have submitted a signed acknowledgement that they will conform to and operate within the code.

The CDJA has 11 chapters across Canada.

1. Vancouver British Columbia Chapter
2. Southern Alberta Chapter
3. Manitoba Chapter
4. London Ontario Chapter
5. Central Ontario Chapter
6. Barrie Ontario Chapter
7. Hamilton Ontario Chapter
8. Greater Toronto Area Chapter
9. Niagara Ontario Chapter
10. Ottawa Ontario Chapter
11. Montreal Quebec Chapter
