= Someday (I Will Understand) =

2005 single by Britney Spears

Single by Britney Spears

from the EP Britney & Kevin: Chaotic
- B-side: "Chaotic"; "Mona Lisa"; "Over to You Now"
- Released: August 18, 2005
- Studio: Conway (Los Angeles); Frou Frou Central (London)
- Genre: Pop
- Length: 3:37
- Label: Jive
- Songwriter: Britney Spears
- Producer: Guy Sigsworth

Britney Spears singles chronology
"Do Somethin'" (2005)	"Someday (I Will Understand)" (2005)	"Gimme More" (2007)

Music video
- "Someday (I Will Understand)" on YouTube

"Someday (I Will Understand)" is a song by American singer Britney Spears. It was written by Spears and produced by Guy Sigsworth. The song was released on August 18, 2005, by Jive Records as the sole single from Spears' first extended play, Britney & Kevin: Chaotic (2005), outside the United States. In July 2004, Spears announced her engagement to American dancer Kevin Federline, later revealing she would be taking another career break to start a family. Spears wrote the song two weeks before knowing she was pregnant with her first child, Sean Preston Federline. A pop ballad, its lyrics refer to a feeling of empowerment as a pregnant woman. A remixed version of the song was included on the 2005 remix compilation, B in the Mix: The Remixes.

"Someday (I Will Understand)" has received mixed to positive reviews from music critics. The song reached the top ten in Denmark, Sweden and Switzerland and also charted in a number of European countries. An accompanying music video, directed by Michael Haussman, premiered on the finale of Spears' reality show Britney and Kevin: Chaotic (2005). Entirely shot in black-and-white, the music video features Spears as a pregnant woman and follows her reflecting along with the songs lyrics in a large empty house.

== Background ==
"Someday (I Will Understand)"
A 21-second sample of "Someday (I Will Understand).

In July 2004, Spears announced her engagement to American dancer Kevin Federline, whom she had met three months before. The romance received intense attention from the media, since Federline had recently broken up with actress Shar Jackson, who was still pregnant with their second child at the time. The initial stages of their relationship were chronicled in Spears's first reality show Britney and Kevin: Chaotic. They held a wedding ceremony on September 18, 2004, but were not legally married until three weeks later on October 6 due to a delay finalizing the couple's prenuptial agreement. In October 2004, the singer announced she would be taking another career break to start a family. Spears gave birth to her first child, Sean Preston Federline, on September 14, 2005.

"Someday (I Will Understand)" was composed by Spears on the piano at her house, two weeks before she learned of her pregnancy with Sean Preston. She explained the song came "like a prophecy... when you're pregnant, you're empowered". It was produced by Guy Sigsworth, who previously worked with the singer on "Everytime" (2004). Spears recorded her vocals for the song at Conway Studios in Los Angeles, California, and at Frou Frou Central in London. The piano was played by Spears herself, while all other instruments (including the drums) and mixing were done by Sigsworth. Background vocals for the song were provided by Kate Havnevik.

== Critical response ==
"Someday (I Will Understand)" initially received mixed to favorable reviews from music critics. While reviewing Britney & Kevin: Chaotic, Mike McGuirk of Rhapsody noted, "Britney now sings about either the husband or the kid." Gil Kaufman of MTV called the song a "horrible Britney ballad with the black-and-white video that began her descent into madness." Leo Ebersole of the Chicago Tribune considered it "a fictional piece", while another reviewer from the same newspaper noted that "as a matter of fact, the song is more or less a lesson in Britney history." Becky Bain of Idolator praised the track, stating that "Britney goes genuine for this ode to her unborn baby." Kurt Kirton of About.com said that "And Then We Kiss" and other remixes of songs like "Toxic" and "Someday (I Will Understand)" on the remix album B in the Mix: The Remixes "hold their own". IGN writer Spence D. noted the Hi-Bias Signature Radio Remix "reverberates with all the clichés that often stifle the music that rustles through the late night/early morning club scenes around the world." Rolling Stone contributor Barry Walters gave the song's remix a negative review, saying that "nothing can rescue Spears' freakishly sappy flop single "Someday (I Will Understand)". Bradley Stern also of MTV, however, praised the Leama & Moor Remix, saying it "transforms the tearjerker of a ballad into a full-on trance anthem. Big beats, stuttering vocals – it's heartbreak on the dance floor."

Over the years following its release, attitude toward the song began to change for the positive. Ten years after its release, a reviewer for AXS called the song "serene" and the "most sincere single of her career." A writer for MuuMuse said that while the song was not career-defining, it was "interesting, and certainly personal."

== Commercial performance ==
On September 1, 2005, "Someday (I Will Understand)" debuted at number 46 on the Swedish Singles Chart. It peaked at number 10 the following week. In Switzerland, the song debuted at number eight on the week of September 4, 2005. On September 9, 2005, the song debuted in the Danish Singles Chart at number 11. The following week, it peaked at the eight position. "Someday (I Will Understand)" also reached the top 20 in Belgium (Flanders and Wallonia), Finland and Norway and charted in Austria and the Netherlands. "Someday (I Will Understand)" has sold 60,000 paid digital downloads in the United States, according to Nielsen SoundScan.

== Music video ==
A pregnant Spears in the music video

The music video for "Someday (I Will Understand)" was directed by Michael Haussman. Spears commented that he "[did] a great job capturing the song, the essence and the emotion" and added that the video had "a different feeling" from any of her previous videos. It was shot entirely in black-and-white. Spears asserted that her life had "come full circle" and implied that in the process she underwent changes in her soul and body, as shown in the video. It premiered on June 14, 2005, during the fifth and last episode of Spears's reality show Britney and Kevin: Chaotic, titled "Veil of Secrecy". The music video features a pregnant Spears lying in bed and walking around a house while singing to her unborn child. She also gazes through the window at the Roman sculptures in the garden.

Hayley Butler of Jam! said "the video is a far cry from the snake handling, sweating and skimpy Britney videos of the past. Dressed in a classy silk dress, she runs through gardens, lies in bed and walks through the grass, all with a burgeoning belly." John Mitchell of MTV included the video on the list "Beyonce, Britney And Madonna: What To Expect When You're Expecting — Music Video Edition" in 2011. Despite praising the track, Idolator blogger Becky Bain stated that "at this point she still looks like a teenager herself, so it's a little disconcerting seeing her with that huge belly, singing about motherhood."

== Track listings ==
- European CD single
1. "Someday (I Will Understand)" – 3:37
2. "Someday (I Will Understand)" (Hi-Bias Signature Radio Remix) – 3:46
- European limited edition maxi single
1. "Someday (I Will Understand)" – 3:37
2. "Someday (I Will Understand)" (Instrumental) – 3:37
3. "Someday (I Will Understand)" (Hi-Bias Signature Radio Remix) – 3:46
4. "Someday (I Will Understand)" (Leama and Andy Moor Remix) – 9:18
- Japanese maxi single
1. "Someday (I Will Understand)" – 3:37
2. "Chaotic" – 3:33
3. "Mona Lisa" – 3:25
4. "Over to You Now" – 3:42
5. "Someday (I Will Understand)" (Hi-Bias Remix) – 3:46

== Credits and personnel ==
Credits are adapted from the Britney & Kevin: Chaotic DVD liner notes.

- Britney Spears – lead vocals, songwriting, piano
- Guy Sigsworth – production
- Sean McGhee – mixing, engineering, programming
- Tom Coyne – mastering
- Kate Havnevik – background vocals

== Charts ==
Weekly chart performance for "Someday (I Will Understand)"
Chart (2005)	Peak position
Austria (Ö3 Austria Top 40)	32
Belgium (Ultratop 50 Flanders)	17
Belgium (Ultratop 50 Wallonia)	11
Denmark (Tracklisten)	8
Finland (Suomen virallinen lista)	15
Germany (GfK)	22
Greece (IFPI)	8
Hungary (Single Top 40)	6
Netherlands (Dutch Top 40 Tipparade)	3
Netherlands (Single Top 100)	36
Norway (VG-lista)	18
Sweden (Sverigetopplistan)	10
Switzerland (Schweizer Hitparade)	8
Ukraine Airplay (TopHit)	67

== Release history ==
Release dates and formats for "Someday (I Will Understand)"
Region	Date	Format(s)	Label(s)	Ref.
France	August 18, 2005	Digital download	Sony BMG	
Denmark	August 22, 2005	CD	Sony BMG	
Germany	August 22, 2005	CD; digital download; maxi CD (limited edition)	Sony BMG	
Luxembourg	August 22, 2005	Digital download	Sony BMG	
Netherlands	August 22, 2005	Digital download	Sony BMG	
United Kingdom	August 22, 2005	Digital download	RCA	
France	August 29, 2005	Maxi CD	Sony BMG	
Japan	September 21, 2005	Maxi CD	Sony BMG	
