= DerHova =

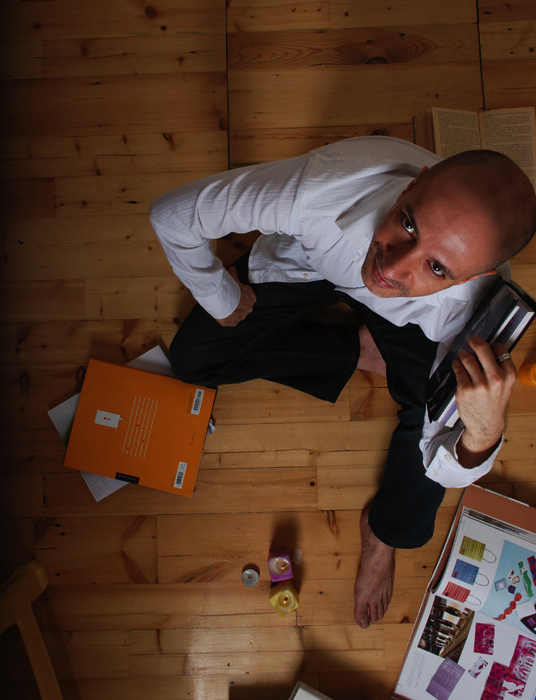

Background information
- Also known as: DerHova; Mark Ryan; 22 Green; Latin Tech; Benz Mezinek
- Born: Harout Arthur Der Hovagimian; 22 February 1974 (age 52); Toronto, Ontario, Canada
- Genres: Pop, Dance, House, R&B, New Age, Folk
- Occupations: Record producer; songwriter; song composer
- Years active: 1992–present
- Website: derhova.com

Harout Arthur Der Hovagimian (sometimes spelled "Ter-Hovakimyan"; born 22 February 1974) is a Canadian-Armenian composer, songwriter and record producer.

== Early life ==
Harout Arthur Der Hovagimian was born in Toronto, Ontario, the son of Armenian parents from Aleppo, Syria. His roots come from the historic Armenian cities of Kharberd, Antep, and Urfa. He attended Dante Alighieri Academy but later graduated from William Lyon Mackenzie Collegiate Institute in 1992.

== Career ==
Der Hovagimian signed his first recording contract at the age of 17 with the newly found Canadian record label Hi-Bias Records. For the following 15 years, he was mainly credited under his stage name "Mark Ryan".

For years, his main focus was his Temperance project. Starting out as a solo Tech house project, his debut commercial release was the five-track Phantasy EP, released early 1992. Temperance eventually crossed over into a more Dance-pop/Eurodance sound with the inclusion of Mark's schoolmate Lorraine Reid on vocals. Their first hit "Music Is My Life" was released in 1994, followed by a number of other hits, worldwide licenses, numerous Juno Award Nominations.

By 19, Mark's on the side successful remix works also led to Billboard magazine titling him one of the top remixers from Canada. In 1996, Temperance peaked with its hi-nrg cover version of the 1980s hit "Forever Young".

In 1997, after the releases of S.P.O.T. (Side Project of Temperance) and the Temperance single "Universal Dream", Mark parted ways to launch 22 Green Productions, primarily focusing on producing and remixing various local and international artists, such as soulDecision, 666, Vapourspace, Urban Cookie Collective, Mia Minx, Emjay, and more.

His song "Qele Qele" performed by Sirusho was Armenia's entry in the Eurovision Song Contest 2008. DerHova composed the song, thought up the title, and produced the original and remix versions of the song. Out of 43 participating countries, it went on to rank 4th (Armenia's highest position in the main song contest, equaled in 2014), and received the most 12 points in the competition.

On September 5, 2010, his production of Mama performed by Vladimir Arzumanyan, was selected as Armenia's entry in the Junior Eurovision Song Contest 2010. On November 20, the song went on to collect the most points (including the most 12 points) to win the contest, Armenia's first victory at any level of Eurovision.

Since 2006, he's worked with many Armenian musicians such as Sevak Amroyan, Sofi Mkheyan, Hasmik Karapetyan, ARPI, Serj Tankian, Shprot, HAYQ, Razmik Amyan, and many more.

Since 2024, he's been collaborating with the Armenian Philharmonic Orchestra in a series of concerts covering classical, film score pieces and classic popular songs, produced in a mix of electronic genres.

== Personal life ==
DerHova currently resides in Yerevan, Armenia.
