= Temperance (group) =

Canadian musical group

- Origin: Toronto, Ontario, Canada
- Genres: Eurodance, Pop, House, Techno, Electronic music
- Years active: 1990–2000
- Label: Hi Bias Records
- Past members: Nick Fiorucci; Mark Ryan; Lorraine Reid

Temperance was a Canadian electronic music duo, formed in Toronto, Ontario, in 1990.

== Biography ==
Temperance was founded by music hobbyist Mark Ryan (H.A. Der-Hovagimian), who began it as a solo commercial Tech house project until he was joined by singer Lorraine Reid. The duo signed a recording contract with Hi-Bias Records in 1991.

Temperance's first commercial release was in early 1992 with the 5-track EP Phantasy. The song "Losing Touch" featured the vocals of Lorraine Reid, Ryan's former schoolmate. The follow-up was a 5-track EP titled Obsessive.

Although the first two releases charted on multiple underground charts throughout the world, Temperance crossed over to commercial pop dance with the release of the single "Music Is My Life" in early 1994. It was the second single on which Lorraine Reid appeared, and thereafter Temperance became known as a group project with Ryan as the sole songwriter and producer, and Reid on lead vocals. In 1994, "Music is My Life" won the MuchMusic Video Award for Best Dance Video.

Over the next three years, Temperance released the album Virtues of Life, and several back-to-back Dance-pop singles which were licensed by nine international labels.

Temperance was considered one of the Canadian pioneers of the early to mid-1990s Eurodance movement, and although most Eurodance singles were considered too aggressive for radio play, Temperance's singles received great airplay on radio as well as in the clubs. They toured worldwide and were nominated for, and/or won, multiple music awards, including seven Juno Award nominations.

In 1996, Mark Ryan launched a solo project under the name 'S.P.O.T.' (an acronym for Side Project Of Temperance). S.P.O.T. had two commercial releases, a 4-track EP titled Drum-Head and a single titled "Welcome to Paradise". It was a departure from the more commercial sound of Temperance, focusing on a more raw house sound. "Welcome to Paradise" became a huge hit throughout many parts of Asia and, a few years later, charted nationally in Canada.

Ryan left Temperance in mid-1997. He was replaced as songwriter and producer by Hi-Bias Records label founder Nick Fiorucci.

With the release of the follow-up second album If You Don't Know in 1999, Temperance took on a more commercial House sound, attracting a more mature audience.

In 2000, the 1996 Temperance cover of the Alphaville song "Forever Young" appeared in Season 1, Episode 18 of the television series Queer As Folk.

Lorraine Reid went on to a career as a linguist. Nick Fiorucci continues directing his label Hi-Bias Records, as well as producing under a few aliases such as Fierce, DJ's Rule and The Polorbabies. Mark Ryan has relocated to Yerevan, Armenia, producing for local artists and producing remixes for international artists, under the pseudonym DerHova.

== Band members ==
- Mark Ryan – songwriting, production, vocals (1990–1997)
- Lorraine Reid - vocals (1992–2000)
- Nick Fiorucci – songwriting, production (1997–2000)

== Discography ==
=== Albums ===
- Virtues of Life (1995), Hi Bias Records, PolyTel
- Hands of Time (1998), Hi Bias Records
- If You Don't Know (1999), Hi Bias Records, Wood Records (Japan)

=== EPs ===
- Phantasy (1992), Hi Bias Records
- Obsessive (1992), Hi Bias Records

=== Singles ===
- "Music Is My Life" (1994), Hi Bias Records, BMG Music Canada, Ariola
- "Never Let You Go" (1995), Hi Bias Records
- "Let Me Take You Away", (1995) DFC (Italy)
- "Let Me Take You Away", "Do They Know It's Christmas?" (1995), Hi Bias Records
- "Forever Young" (1996), Hi Bias Records, Popular Records (US)
- "Lost in Love" (1996), Hi Bias Records
- "Universal Dream" (1997), Hi Bias Records
- "Hands of Time" (1998), Hi Bias Records, Discoball, (Sweden), ZYX Music (Germany), Dance Factory (Italy)
- "Dancing in the Key of Love" (1998), Hi Bias Records, One Step Music (UK)
- "Chains of Love" (1999), Hi Bias Records
- "If You Don't Know" (1999), Hi Bias Records, Attic Records
- "Ain't No Stoppin' Us Now" (1999), Hi Bias Records, Club Culture Records
- "Before You Never Call Me Again", "Believer" (2000), Hi Bias Records, V.O.T.U. Records (Italy)
- "My Sentiments Exactly" (2001), Hi Bias Records

=== Compilation appearances and splits ===
- "My Sentiments Exactly" / Do You Feel The Same" feat Mystah Munroe, split with Jerrell (2001), Hi Bias Records
- "Open Your Eyes" / "My Sentiments Exactly" feat Mystah Munroe, split with Alicia (2001), Hi Bias Records
