= Britney and Kevin: Chaotic =

American reality television series

- Genre: Reality
- Created by: Anthony E. Zuiker
- Directed by: Anthony E. Zuiker
- Starring: Britney Spears; Kevin Federline; Felicia Culotta; Jamie Lynn Spears; JC Chasez
- Theme music composer: Michelle Bell; Christian Karlsson; Pontus Winnberg; Henrik Jonback
- Opening theme: "Chaotic" by Britney Spears
- Country of origin: United States
- No. of seasons: 1
- No. of episodes: 5

Production
- Executive producers: Britney Spears; Kevin Federline; Susan Zirinsky
- Producers: Loen Kelley; Michael Vele
- Cinematography: Jack McGoldrick
- Editor: Michael Vele
- Running time: 22 minutes

Original release
- Network: UPN
- Release: May 17 – June 14, 2005

Britney and Kevin: Chaotic is an American reality television series created and directed by Anthony E. Zuiker. Starring pop singer Britney Spears and her then-husband Kevin Federline, the five-episode series aired on UPN from May 17 to June 14, 2005. The series chronicles the couple's relationship from their courtship, engagement and wedding.

A majority of the footage was originally shot for Spears' own reality series to document the European leg of the Onyx Hotel Tour in the spring of 2004. Spears fell and injured her left knee during the shooting of the music video for "Outrageous", causing the remainder of the tour to be cancelled.

Britney and Kevin: Chaotic was heavily panned by critics, who considered the series to be career suicide for Spears. Critics noted Spears' excessive narcissism and criticized the themes of the series as being too explicit. The DVD release of Britney and Kevin: Chaotic included Spears' first extended play of the same name.

== Background ==
MTV News announced in April 2004 that Spears was planning a reality television series to document her backstage life during the European leg of The Onyx Hotel Tour. Pitched as OnTourage, footage from the six-week leg was to be compiled into a six-episode series, with each episode selling for about $1 million, "much more than most reality programs". Spears was to narrate and shoot footage of her with her dancers and handlers. The show was planned to be completed "as early as summer".

On June 8, Spears was shooting the music video for "Outrageous" in Queens, when she fell and injured her left knee. She was taken immediately to a local hospital and underwent arthroscopic surgery the next day. She was forced to remain six weeks with a knee brace, followed by eight to twelve weeks of rehabilitation, which caused any future concerts to be canceled.

In July, Spears announced her engagement to American dancer Kevin Federline, whom she had met three months before. As Federline had only recently ended his relationship with actress Shar Jackson, who was pregnant with their second child, this engagement was the subject of extensive media coverage. They held a wedding ceremony on September 18, 2004, but were not legally married until three weeks later on October 6 due to a delay finalizing the couple's prenuptial agreement. In October 2004, the singer announced she would be taking another career break to start a family.

== Development ==
After a "fierce bidding war", on April 5, 2005, it was announced that Spears had signed a deal with UPN to air a reality television series documenting her relationship with Federline. The series, which would air in five episodes, was revealed to chronicle the relationship "from the earliest stages of their courtship to their engagement and ultimately, their stroll down the aisle". In a statement about the series, Spears stated: "From the day that Kevin and I met, there have been constant rumors and inaccurate speculation about our lives together. I feel that last year, the tabloids ran my life, and I am really excited about showing my fans what really happened, rather than all the stories, which have been misconstrued by journalists in the past. As I mentioned before, I am now going to be expressing my personal life through art".

The series was initially titled Britney and Kevin: Can You Handle Our Truth?, before its title was changed to Britney and Kevin: Chaotic, with "Can you handle our truth?" becoming its tagline. All of the footage shot for OnTourage was used for Britney and Kevin: Chaotic. According to Spears, the series helped the couple to know each other more, saying: "I didn't know [Kevin] that well, and when I got the camera out, it made me feel better. It's really weird because it was like all this tension at first. We were so nervous being together. I'm really shy, and when I had the camera in my hand, it made me feel more outspoken."

== Episodes ==
| No. | Title | Directed by | Original release date | U.S. viewers (millions) |
|---|---|---|---|---|
| 1 | "Can You Handle My Truth?" | Anthony E. Zuiker | May 17, 2005 | 3.66 |
Spears casually plays around with a new camera, occasionally focusing on other people, but largely keeping the lens on herself. She asks the people around her about their opinions on love, their favourite sex positions, as well as marriage while in London on tour. Federline is introduced as Spears' new love interest, after she confesses to having sex with him three times in one day to Felicia outrageously on the treadmill.
| 2 | "Who Said Anything About Love?" | Anthony E. Zuiker | May 24, 2005 | 3.04 |
Spears catches the first special moments of her relationship with Federline. Also, she experiences nerves about Federline's first time watching her perform onstage.
| 3 | "Scared to Love You" | Anthony E. Zuiker | May 31, 2005 | 2.51 |
Spears and Federline's relationship has progressed to the point where Spears reveals that she loves him. However, after Federline fails to respond the same, Spears closes up somewhat about her feelings and confides to the camera for comfort.
| 4 | "Magic Happens" | Anthony E. Zuiker | June 7, 2005 | 2.49 |
After a day in Paris, Spears realizes that Federline is "the one" for her, so she proposes. Federline says no and later asks her to marry him.
| 5 | "Veil of Secrecy" | Anthony E. Zuiker | June 14, 2005 | 2.10 |
Spears and Federline's family and friends arrive at what they thought was an engagement party, to find out that they were actually going to attend their wedding. Felicia ends up catching the bouquet.

== Home media ==
Britney and Kevin: Chaotic was made available on DVD on September 27, 2005. Packaged with an extended play (EP) including three previously unreleased tracks by Spears, the DVD contains the series' five episodes, as well as unreleased footage, two music videos, and a photo gallery of the couple's wedding ceremony. In Japan, the DVD peaked at number 40 on the Oricon DVD chart, staying on the chart for four weeks.

== Reception ==
=== Critical response ===
Britney and Kevin: Chaotic was heavily panned by critics. Taylor Carik of Flak Magazine considered the series an "insult to common sense and decency", while commenting that "Britney's ridiculous behavior in Chaotic confirms the obvious transparency of her status as a 'celebrity product' and the calculated nature of her success". He also noted that music critics would "easily open the floodgates for new and creative ways to discuss her offense to pop culture's attempts at meaningfulness". Aaron Beierle of DVD Talk reviewed the series as an "absolute disaster of the highest order", while writing that: "[Britney & Kevin: Chaotic] is an absolutely watchable and horrifying train wreck of a series". Slant Magazine writer Ed Gonzalez noted that "the show's extreme shooting style makes it especially hard to stare at what is—no more no less—a totem to the pop singer's narcissism". He stated that the views Spears expresses in the series suggest that she is "someone who believes they're the only person on the face of the earth".

Josh Wolk of Entertainment Weekly felt that Britney and Kevin: Chaotic was Spears' "career suicide by videocam", commenting, "the truth is not only that she's vapid, but that she's self-obsessed to a dangerous degree". Wolk also noted "many intersecting things wrong on this show and with Britney that I can't possibly prioritize them". Laura Fries of Variety perceived the series as "a visual assault of nauseating camera angles, likely to upset even the most desensitized TV viewer". Hayley Butler of Jam! gave the final episode of the series a mixed review, saying it "was full of tear-jerking moments" and "the only episode not full of stupid jokes, childish behaviour and Britney's thoughts on life", commenting that Spears and Federline wedding scenes "looked to be a very emotional and touching event". Butler also wondered "if they feel their show served its purpose".

During a 2013 interview, Spears described the series as "probably the worst thing I've done in my career", and said: "I would never do something like that again."

=== U.S. television ratings ===
The first episode of the series was seen by 3.7 million viewers, making it UPN's most-watched piece of regularly scheduled programming in the 9pm Tuesday timeslot since March 2004. The second episode garnered three million viewers, finishing in eighty-first in its timeslot for the week. The third and fourth episode were viewed by 2.5 million viewers each, while the final, aired an hour earlier at 8:00pm Eastern Standard Time, drew 2.1 million viewers. In one month, Britney and Kevin: Chaotic lost 1.6 million viewers.
