= David Bloom (Canadian) =

Canadian businessman (1943–2016)

David R. Bloom (1943 – September 25, 2016) was a Canadian businessman who was the CEO of Shoppers Drug Mart for 18 years.

In 1967, Bloom began his career with Shoppers Drug Mart as a pharmacist at the store in Yorkdale Shopping Centre. Within a year, he became the associate (pharmacist owner) at that location. In 1971, he joined Shoppers' Corporate Centre. He was given several promotions. By 1983, he became president and chief executive officer. Three years later, he was made the chairman and chief executive officer. While he was CEO, Shoppers expanded from 400 to 837 stores, sales quadrupled and earnings grew tenfold.

Bloom is a founder of the Canadian Association of Chain Drug Stores, a former chairman of the Retail Council of Canada and a board member of the U.S.-based National Association of Chain Drug Stores. After retiring from Shoppers in 2001, he became the president and a director of DGRB Consultants Inc. He also serves as a director for Sterling Centrecorp. Inc., the Hospital for Sick Children and the Canadian Technology Transfer Fund.

== Awards ==
- 1996, named the Distinguished Canadian Retailer of the Year by the Retail Council of Canada
- 2001, inducted into the Canadian Retail Education Hall of Fame
