= Britney Spears products =

Products endorsed by Britney Spears

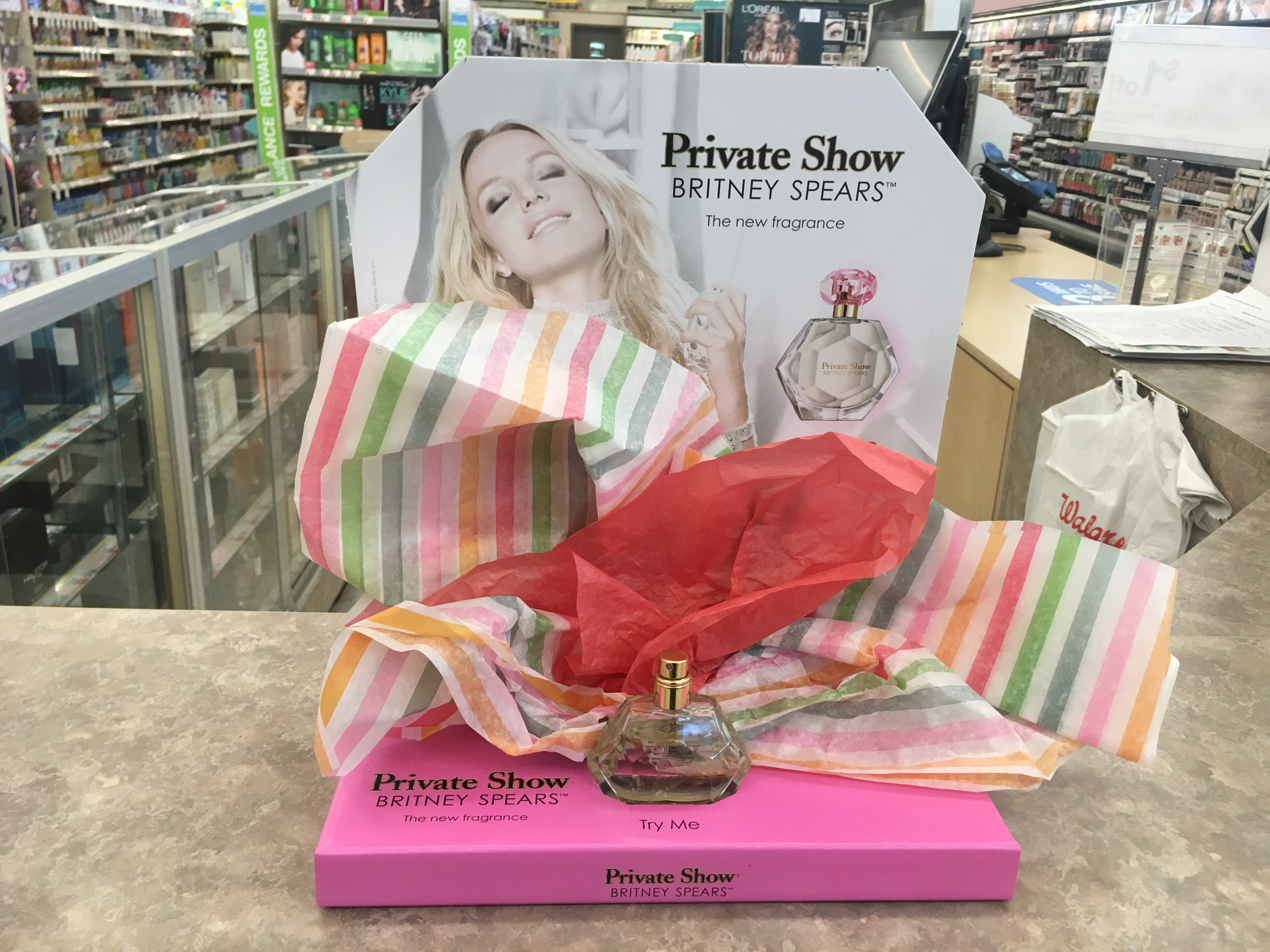
Spears's Private Show perfume

American singer Britney Spears has developed and endorsed a number of products; these have included books, video releases, video games, dolls, clothing, and perfumes. In 2000, Spears released a limited edition of sunglasses titled Shades of Britney. In 2001, she signed a deal with shoe company Skechers, and a $7–8 million promotional deal with Pepsi, their biggest entertainment deal at the time. Aside from numerous commercials with the latter during that year, she also appeared in a 2004 Pepsi television commercial in the theme of "Gladiators" with singers Beyoncé, Pink, and Enrique Iglesias. On June 19, 2002, she released her first multi-platform video game, Britney's Dance Beat, which received positive reviews. In March 2009, Spears was announced as the new face of clothing brand Candie's. Dari Marder, chief marketing officer for the brand, explained why they choose the singer, saying, "everybody loves a comeback and nobody's doing it better than Britney. She's just poised for even greater success." In 2010, Spears designed a limited edition line for the brand, which was released in stores in July. In 2011, she teamed up with Sony, Make Up For Ever, and Plenty of Fish to release her music video for "Hold It Against Me", earning her $500,000 for the product placement. Spears also teamed up with Hasbro in 2012 to release an exclusive version of Twister Dance, which includes a remix of "Till the World Ends". The singer was also featured on a commercial, which was directed by Ray Kay, to promote the game. Spears was also featured on the commercial of "Twister Rave" and the game included a Twister remix of "Circus". In March 2018, it was revealed that Spears would be the face of Kenzo, a contemporary French luxury clothing house.

Spears's range of commercial deals and products also includes beauty care products and perfumes. She released her first perfume, Curious, with Elizabeth Arden in 2004, which broke the company's first-week gross for a perfume. By 2009, she had released seven more perfumes including Fantasy. In 2010, Spears released her eighth fragrance, Radiance. In March 2011, company Brand Sense filed a lawsuit against Spears and Elizabeth Arden seeking $10 million in damages, claiming that she and her father, Jamie, stopped paying their thirty-five percent commission that was agreed as part of the contract terms. In July 2011, a Los Angeles judge denied the request by the company lawyers, claiming the fact that Spears was still under conservatorship. Brand Sense, however, stated that they would appeal the decision. In 2011, Radiance was reissued as a new perfume titled Cosmic Radiance. Worldwide, Spears sold over one million bottles in the first five years, with gross receipts of $1.5 billion. As of 2013, Spears's fragrances earn $30 million a year. In 2016, Spears contacted Glu Mobile to create her own role-playing game, Britney Spears: American Dream. The app officially launched in May 2016 and is compatible with iOS and Android. On June 17, 2016, Spears announced the release of her twentieth fragrance, Private Show. As of January 2018, Spears has released 24 fragrances through Elizabeth Arden. In 2022, Spears signed a $15 million book deal with Simon & Schuster, for her upcoming memoir, The Woman in Me, set to be released in October 2023. It is one of the biggest book deals of all time.

In November 2024, Spears announced on Instagram that she is planning to release a jewelry line called ‘B Tiny’.

== Fragrances ==
Spears endorsed her first Elizabeth Arden perfume, Curious, in 2004, and made $100 million in sales in its first year. In September 2005, Spears released the fragrance Fantasy. In April 2006, Spears launched Curious: In Control as a limited edition fragrance. The same year, she released another perfume titled Midnight Fantasy. September 24, 2007 marked the release date of the fragrance collection Believe. She released her sixth perfume, Curious Heart, in January 2008. In December 2008, Spears released two more perfumes with the release of her sixth studio album, Circus. In 2009, Curious won the Glammy Award for Best Beauty Buy of 2009 by Glamour readers, for Best Drugstore Fragrance.

As of 2009, Spears claimed to have sold 30 million bottles worldwide. As of 2012, her fragrances brand had grossed over $1.5 billion worldwide. According to a Daily Express newspaper report in 2013, a bottle of a Spears fragrance was sold every 15 seconds worldwide. In 2018, Spears released her twenty-fifth and first ever unisex fragrance, Prerogative. As of July 2023, Spears has released 42 fragrances under her brand.

Complete list of Spears's perfumes
№	Fragrance	Tagline	Year	Ref.
1	Curious	"Do you dare?"	2004	
2	Fantasy	"Everybody has one."	2005	
3	Curious: In Control	"Are you?"	2006	
4	Midnight Fantasy	"Magic begins at midnight."	2006	
5	Believe	"The greatest freedom is to believe in yourself."	2007	
6	Curious Heart	"Live yours to the fullest."	2008	
7	Hidden Fantasy	"What do you have to hide?"	2009	
8	Circus Fantasy	"Where nothing is what it seems..."	2009	
9	Radiance	"Choose your own destiny."	2010	
10	Cosmic Radiance	"Be the brightest star in the universe."	2011	
11	Fantasy Twist	"Choose your fantasy."	2012	
12	Island Fantasy	"What's your island fantasy?"	2013	
13	Fantasy: Anniversary Edition	None	2013	
14	Fantasy: The Nice Remix	"Everybody has one. Naughty or nice"	2014	
15	Fantasy: The Naughty Remix	"Everybody has one. Naughty or nice"	2014	
16	Fantasy: Stage Edition	None	2014	
17	Rocker Femme Fantasy	None	2014	
18	Fantasy Renner Exclusive	None	2015	
19	Fantasy Intimate Edition	"Everybody has an intimate fantasy."	2015	
20	Maui Fantasy	"Aloha from Hawaii."	2016	
21	Private Show	"It's your private show"	2016	
22	Fantasy in Bloom	None	2017	
23	VIP Private Show	"It's your #VIPSHOW"	2017	
24	Sunset Fantasy	"Experience summer in a bottle."	2018	
25	Prerogative	"A fragrance for all."	2018	
26	Fantasy: Pride Edition	None	2018	
27	Rainbow Fantasy	"What color is your fantasy?"	2019	
28	Prerogative Rave	"The new uninhibited fragrance for all."	2019	
29	Midnight Fantasy: Halloween Edition	"Magic begins at midnight."	2019	
30	Glitter Fantasy	"Dare to shine."	2020	
31	Fantasy: 15th Anniversary Special Pride Edition	None	2020 (Note: Released only in the United Kingdom.)	
32	Prerogative Ego	"What's your prerogative?"	2020	
33	Festive Fantasy	"Life is a fantasy."	2020	
34	Fantasy Intense	"Your new fantasy awaits."	2021	
35	Fantasy: Pride Edition	"Fantasy. Everybody has one."	2021	
36	Electric Fantasy	"Electrify your fantasy."	2021	
37	Fantasy Sheer	"Your next fantasy awaits."	2021	
38	Blissful Fantasy	"Find your bliss."	2022	
39	Fantasy: Pride Edition	"Fantasy for everybody."	2022	
40	Naked Fantasy	"Bare your beauty."	2022	
41	Fantasy: Special Pride Edition	"Fantasy for everybody."	2023	
42	Jungle Fantasy	"Unleash your wildest fantasy."	2023	
43	Curious (Superdrug's 60th Birthday Exclusive Package)		May 2024	
44	Candied Fantasy	"Make life a little sweeter"	May 2024	
45	Fantasy: Pride Edition (2024)	"Fantasy for everybody"	June 2024	
46	Pure Fantasy		Unreleased	
47	Fantasy: Did It again Edition	"Dare to do it again"	September 2025	
48	Fantasy: Goddess		August 2026	

== Toys and games ==
=== Dolls ===
In 1999, Play Along Toys released the Britney Spears doll. It was the first product ever released by this toy company. The doll featured Spears with various outfits, make-up, and hairstyles from her concerts, appearances, photoshoots, and music videos. Yaboom Toys also made a singing Britney Spears doll that would "sing" when her belly button was pressed – along with miniature dolls and Spears's concert stages and tour bus toy replicas. The line of merchandise eventually included Spears's porcelain dolls.

=== Video game ===
Britney's Dance Beat is a one or two player music video game featuring songs and video appearances by Spears. The story is that players must pass "auditions" to tour as Spears's dancers. Gameplay involves pressing buttons in time with music. Symbols for buttons are arranged in a circle, resembling a clock dial. A pointer sweeps around the dial, indicating when to press each button.

The game contains five songs: "...Baby One More Time", "Oops!... I Did It Again", "Stronger", "Overprotected", and "I'm a Slave 4 U". Successful play is rewarded with "backstage passes" which unlocks features such as backstage video footage of Spears.

=== Mobile games ===
A cell phone game created by Qplaze-RME and Sony BMG titled Adventures of Britney Spears was announced in December 2005 but was never released. Images and video footage of the game were released along with the game's press release.

Ten years later, Spears started working on a game with Glu. In 2016, she released a casual role play as a pop star game called Britney Spears: American Dream in May 2016 and it sold 500,000 copies. The freemium game was developed by Glu, the company that developed Kim Kardashian: Hollywood.

== Clothing ==
In March 2009, Spears was announced as the new face of Candie's, a clothing brand marketed for pre-teens and teenagers. After being the face of the line for two years, it was announced that Spears would design a limited edition collection for Candie's which would be unveiled by mid year. It premiered on July 1, 2010 with prices ranging from $14 to $78. In an interview with InStyle's website, Spears announced a few more pieces would be sold in September and October and that she would love to design for them again.

In August 2014, Spears launched an undergarment brand with the Danish company Change Lingerie, for sale online and in Change Lingerie stores.

== Books ==
Book title	Release date	Publisher	Pages	Identifiers	Ref.
Heart-to-Heart	May 9, 2000	Three Rivers Press	144	ISBN 978-0-609-80701-9	
A Mother's Gift	April 10, 2001	Delacorte Books	240	ISBN 978-0-385-72953-6	
Stages	November 26, 2002	Team Power Publishing	103	ISBN 978-0-972-45750-7	
The Woman in Me	October 24, 2023	Gallery Books	288	ISBN 978-1-668-00904-8	

== Other products ==
Spears released a range of hair care products in the supermarket chain Lidl in England, in December 2014.

== Endorsements ==
Spears has endorsed several brands throughout her career, including Pepsi, Polaroid, McDonald's, Hasbro, Versace, NFL, Skechers, Got Milk?, Tommy Hilfiger, Clairol, Herbal Essences, Samsung, Nabisco, Virgin Mobile, Zappos, Kenzo, Sbarro, ABC, HBO, Candies, Kohl's, Starburst candy, Eos, iHeart Radio, Kirin Company, Apple Music, Disney, Los Angeles Dodgers, and Toyota. She has also included endorsements in her music videos for brands such as Bvlgari, Swarovski, Volkswagen, Mazda, MateFit, Plenty of Fish, Beats Electronics, Sony, Nokia, Lamborghini, and Samsung.

== Accolades & Listicles ==
Award	Year	Recipient(s)	Category	Result	Ref.
Basenotes Fragrance Awards	2007	Curious	Best Celebrity Fragrance for Women of the Year	Won	
Basenotes Fragrance Awards	2007	Fantasy	Best Celebrity Fragrance for Women of the Year	Won	
Basenotes Fragrance Awards	2008	Fantasy	Best Celebrity Women's Fragrance	Won	
Basenotes Fragrance Awards	2009	Fantasy	Best Celebrity Women's Fragrance	Won	
Celebmix Awards	2023	The Woman In Me	Pop Culture Moment of The Year	Nominated	
Cosmopolitan Awards	2009	Hidden Fantasy	Best Celebrity Fragrance for Women	Nominated	
Cosmopolitan Awards	2010	Circus Fantasy	Best Celebrity Fragrance for Women	Won	
Cosmopolitan Awards	2013	Island Fantasy	Best Celebrity Fragrance for Women	Nominated	
FiFi Awards	2005	Curious	Consumer's Women Choice Awards — CosmoGirl!	Won	
FiFi Awards	2005	Curious	Best Women’s Perfume	Won	
FiFi Awards	2005	Curious	Women’s Luxe — CosmoGirl!	Finalist	
FiFi Awards	2006	Fantasy	Fragrance of the Year — Women’s Luxe	Finalist	
FiFi Awards	2011	Radiance	Women's Best Packaging of the Year	Nominated	
FiFi Awards	2016	Fantasy	Women's Fragrance of the Year – Popular	Finalist	
FiFi Awards	2019	Prerogative	Women's Fragrance of the Year – Popular	Finalist	
Fragrantica Choice Awards (Note: Fragrantica Awards is an online awards team.)	2017	Fantasy	Best Fragrance of All Times for Women	Nominated	
Fragrantica Choice Awards	2017	Curious	Best Fragrance of All Times for Women	Nominated	
Fragrantica Choice Awards	2017	Midnight Fantasy	Best Fragrance of All Times for Women	Nominated	
Fragrantica Choice Awards	2017	Believe	Best Fragrance of All Times for Women	Nominated	
Fragrantica Choice Awards	2017	Believe	Best Unisex Fragrance of All Time	Nominated	
Fragrantica Choice Awards	2017	Fantasy	Best Fragrance for Cold Days	Nominated	
Fragrantica Choice Awards	2017	Hidden Fantasy	Best Fragrance for Cold Days	Nominated	
Fragrantica Choice Awards	2017	Private Show	Best Fragrance for Cold Days	Nominated	
Fragrantica Choice Awards	2017	Fantasy Anniversary Edition	Best Fragrance for Cold Days	Nominated	
Fragrantica Choice Awards	2017	Curious	Best Fragrance for Hot Days	Nominated	
Fragrantica Choice Awards	2017	Island Fantasy	Best Fragrance for Hot Days	Nominated	
Fragrantica Choice Awards	2017	VIP Private Show	Best Perfume Flanker of the Year	Nominated	
Fragrantica Choice Awards	2017	Fantasy in Bloom	Best Perfume Flanker of the Year	Nominated	
Fragrantica Choice Awards	2017	Fantasy Intimate Edition	The Legend of the Latest Decade for Women	Nominated	
Fragrantica Choice Awards	2017	Fantasy	Best Bargain Fragrance for Women	Won	
Fragrantica Choice Awards	2017	Fantasy: The Naughty Remix	Best Bargain Fragrance for Women	Nominated	
Fragrantica Choice Awards	2017	Midnight Fantasy	Best Bargain Fragrance for Women	Nominated	
Fragrantica Choice Awards	2017	Believe	Best Bargain Fragrance for Women	Nominated	
Fragrantica Choice Awards	2017	Hidden Fantasy	Best Bargain Fragrance for Women	Nominated	
Fragrantica Choice Awards	2017	Fantasy: The Nice Remix	Best Bargain Fragrance for Women	Nominated	
Fragrantica Choice Awards	2017	Private Show	Best Bargain Fragrance for Women	Nominated	
Fragrantica Choice Awards	2017	Curious	Best Bargain Fragrance for Women	Nominated	
Fragrantica Choice Awards	2017	Fantasy	Beloved Perfumes Murdered by Reformulation	Nominated	
Fragrantica Choice Awards	2018	Fantasy	Women Fragrance of the Year	Nominated	
Fragrantica Choice Awards	2018	Prerogative	Women Fragrance of the Year	Nominated	
Fragrantica Choice Awards	2018	Prerogative	Best Unisex Fragrance	Nominated	
Fragrantica Choice Awards	2018	Sunset Fantasy	Best Perfume Bottle of the Year	Nominated	
Fragrantica Choice Awards	2018	Fantasy in Bloom	Best Perfume Flanker of the Year	Nominated	
Fragrantica Choice Awards	2018	Sunset Fantasy	Best Perfume Flanker of the Year	Nominated	
Fragrantica Choice Awards	2018	Fantasy	Best Gourmand Fragrance of the Year	Nominated	
Fragrantica Choice Awards	2018	Midnight Fantasy	Best Gourmand Fragrance of the Year	Nominated	
Fragrantica Choice Awards	2018	Hidden Fantasy	Best Gourmand Fragrance of the Year	Nominated	
Fragrantica Choice Awards	2019	Rainbow Fantasy	Women Fragrance of the Year	Nominated	
Fragrantica Choice Awards	2019	Prerogative	Women Fragrance of the Year	Nominated	
Fragrantica Choice Awards	2019	Prerogative	Best Unisex Perfume of the Year	Nominated	
Fragrantica Choice Awards	2019	Rainbow Fantasy	Biggest Perfume Flex 2019	Nominated	
Fragrantica Choice Awards	2019	Fantasy	Best Women's Perfume of All Time	Nominated	
Fragrantica Choice Awards	2019	Curious	Best Women's Perfume of All Time	Nominated	
Fragrantica Choice Awards	2019	Midnight Fantasy	Best Women's Perfume of All Time	Nominated	
Fragrantica Choice Awards	2019	Private Show	Best Women's Perfume of All Time	Nominated	
Fragrantica Choice Awards	2019	Believe	Best Women's Perfume of All Time	Nominated	
Fragrantica Choice Awards	2020	Rainbow Fantasy	Best Perfume for Women 2020	Won	
Fragrantica Choice Awards	2020	Prerogative Ego	Best Perfume for Women 2020	Won	
Fragrantica Choice Awards	2021	Fantasy Intense	Best Perfume for Women 2021	Won	
Fragrantica Choice Awards	2021	Fantasy Sheer	Best Perfume for Women 2021	Won	
Fragrantica Choice Awards	2021	Electric Fantasy	Best Perfume for Women 2021	Won	
Fragrantica Choice Awards	2021	Glitter Fantasy	Best Perfume for Women 2021	Won	
Fragrance Foundation Awards	2005	Curious	2005 Consumers Choice — Women’s	Won	
Fragrance Foundation Awards	2023	Fantasy	Fragrance Hall of Fame	Won	
Glammy Awards	2006	Curious	The Best Fragrances	Won	
Glammy Awards	2007	Curious	The Best Fragrances	Won	
Glammy Awards	2008	Curious	The Best Fragrances	Won	
Glammy Awards	2009	Curious	The Best Fragrances	Won	
Glammy Awards	2010	Curious	The Best Fragrances	Won	
Goodreads Choice Awards	2023	The Woman in Me	Best Memoir & Autobiography	Won	
Hollywood Beauty Awards	2018	Fantasy in Bloom	Fragrance of the Year	Won	
Sa Sa Awards	2009	Fantasy	Best Celebrity Fragrance of the Year	Won	
