= Britney Spears =

American singer (born 1981)

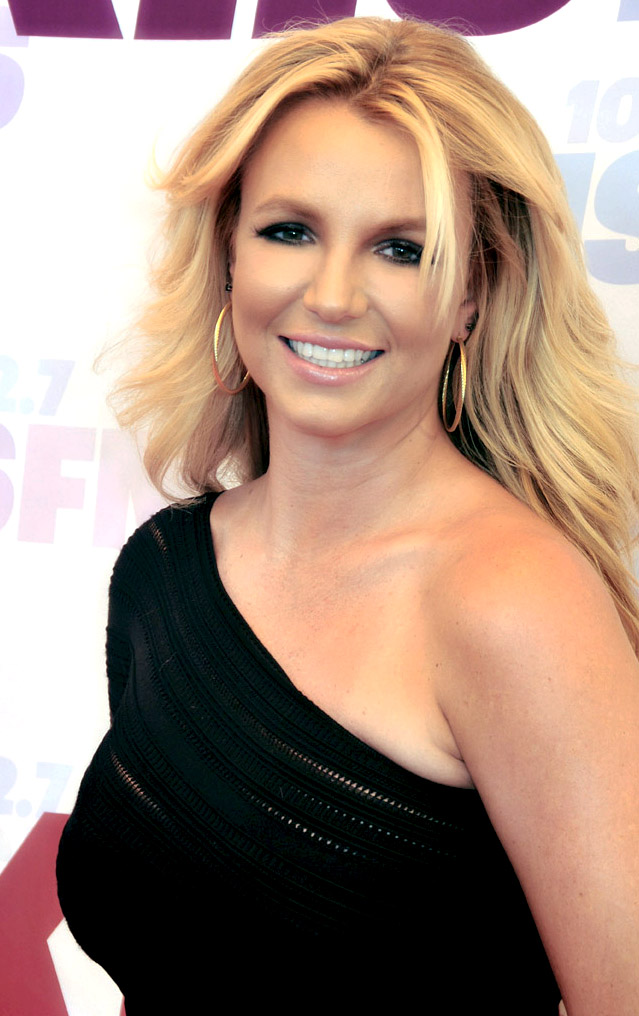
- Spears in 2013
- Born: Britney Jean Spears; December 2, 1981 (age 44); McComb, Mississippi, U.S.
- Occupations: Singer; songwriter; dancer; actress
- Years active: 1992–present
- Works: Discography; songs; unreleased; videography
- Spouses: Jason Alexander (m. 2004; ann. 2004); Kevin Federline (m. 2004; div. 2007); Sam Asghari (m. 2022; div. 2024)
- Partner: Jason Trawick (2009–2013; engaged 2011)
- Children: 2
- Parents: Jamie Spears; Lynne Bridges
- Relatives: Bryan Spears (brother); Jamie Lynn Spears (sister)
- Awards: Full list
- Musical career
- Genre: Pop
- Instruments: Vocals
- Labels: Jive; RCA
- Website: britneyspears.com britney.com

Britney Jean Spears (born December 2, 1981) is an American singer. Referred to as the "Princess of Pop", she is known for her unique vocal style and energetic stage performances. Spears's role in reviving teen pop music established her as the best-selling teenage artist of all time and one of the most influential entertainers of the early 21st century.

Spears began her career in the early 1990s as a cast member of the musical Ruthless! and the final two seasons of The All-New Mickey Mouse Club. After signing with Jive Records in 1997, she released her debut single, "...Baby One More Time", which topped the US Billboard Hot 100 and became one of the best-selling singles in history. Her first two albums, ...Baby One More Time (1999) and Oops!... I Did It Again (2000), are among the world's best-selling albums, while her third album, Britney (2001), became a 21st-century bestseller. In 2002, she starred in the film Crossroads. Her fourth album, In the Zone (2003), featured the single "Toxic", which won a Grammy Award for Best Dance Recording.

Spears's highly publicized personal struggles influenced her fifth album, Blackout (2007). After her involuntary placement under a conservatorship, Spears released the albums Circus (2008), Femme Fatale (2011), Britney Jean (2013) and Glory (2016). With "Womanizer", "3", and "Hold It Against Me", she became the third woman to top the Billboard Hot 100 in three separate decades. In 2019, Spears withdrew from regular concert touring to focus on her controversial conservatorship case. She later testified against her family and management for maltreatment, leading to the conservatorship's termination in 2021. Spears announced her departure from the music industry in 2024, and sold her music catalogue for a reported $200 million in 2026.

Spears is one of the best-selling music artists of all time, with estimated sales of over 150 million records. Forbes named her as the world's highest-paid female musician in 2000 and 2012. She was ranked among the 100 most influential people in the world by Time (2021) and the greatest pop stars of the 21st century by Billboard (2023). Her accolades include one Grammy Award, six MTV Video Music Awards (including the Michael Jackson Video Vanguard Award), seven Billboard Music Awards and a star on the Hollywood Walk of Fame. Spears has launched numerous products, with her 2005 fragrance Fantasy with Elizabeth Arden, Inc. generating over $1.5 billion in sales by 2011. Her life and career were the subject of the documentary Framing Britney Spears (2021) and memoir The Woman in Me (2023).

== Life and career ==
=== 1981–1997: Early life, family, and career beginnings ===
Britney Jean Spears was born on December 2, 1981 in McComb, Mississippi, the second child of Lynne Irene (née Bridges) and James "Jamie" Parnell Spears. Her maternal grandmother, Lillian Portell, was English and born in London, and one of Spears's maternal great-grandfathers was Maltese. She spent her formative years with her siblings Bryan and Jamie Lynn and their parents in Kentwood, Louisiana.

Born in the Bible Belt, where socially conservative evangelical Protestantism is a particularly strong religious influence, she was baptized as a Southern Baptist and sang in a church choir as a child. As an adult, she studied Kabbalist teachings. On August 5, 2021, Spears announced that she had converted to Catholicism. Her mother and sister are also Catholic. However, in September 2022, after Spears's ex-husband, Kevin Federline, and youngest son did an interview defending her father's actions during her conservatorship, she stated: "I don't believe in God anymore because of the way my children and my family have treated me. There is nothing to believe in anymore. I'm an atheist y'all."

In 1984, at the age of two, Spears began attending dance lessons in Kentwood and was selected to perform as a solo artist at the annual recital. Not long after, she sang "What Child Is This?" at her kindergarten graduation. During her childhood, she also had gymnastics and voice lessons and won many state-level competitions and children's talent shows. In gymnastics, Spears attended Béla Károlyi's training camp. She said of her ambition as a child, "I was in my own world [...] I found out what I'm supposed to do at an early age".

When she was eight, she and Lynne traveled to Atlanta, Georgia, to audition for the 1990s revival of The Mickey Mouse Club. Casting director Matt Casella rejected her as too young but introduced her to Nancy Carson, a New York City talent agent. Carson was impressed with Spears's singing and suggested enrolling her at the Professional Performing Arts School.

Spears was hired for her first professional role as the understudy for the lead role of Tina Denmark in the off-Broadway musical Ruthless!. She also appeared as a contestant on the popular television show Star Search and was cast in several commercials. In December 1992, she appeared in The All-New Mickey Mouse Club. Fellow cast members included Christina Aguilera, Justin Timberlake, Ryan Gosling, Keri Russell, and JC Chasez. After the show's 1994 cancellation, she returned to Mississippi and enrolled at McComb's Parklane Academy. Although she made friends with most of her classmates, she compared the school to "the opening scene in Clueless with all the cliques. [...] I was so bored. I was the point guard on the basketball team. I had my boyfriend, and I went to homecoming and Christmas formal. But I wanted more."

In June 1997, Spears negotiated with manager Lou Pearlman to join the female pop group Innosense. Lynne asked family friend and entertainment lawyer Larry Rudolph for his opinion and submitted a tape of Spears singing over a Whitney Houston karaoke song along with some pictures. Rudolph decided that he wanted to pitch her to record labels, for which she needed a professional demo. He sent Spears an unused song of Toni Braxton; she rehearsed for a week and recorded her vocals in a studio. Spears traveled to New York with the demo and met with executives from four labels, returning to Kentwood the same day. Three of the labels rejected her, saying that audiences wanted pop bands such as the Backstreet Boys and the Spice Girls, and "there wasn't going to be another Madonna, another Debbie Gibson, or another Tiffany".

Two weeks later, executives from Jive Records returned calls to Rudolph. Senior vice president of A&R Jeff Fenster said about Spears's audition that "it's very rare to hear someone that age who can deliver emotional content and commercial appeal [...] For any artist, the motivation—the 'eye of the tiger'—is extremely important. And Britney had that." Spears sang Houston's "I Have Nothing" (1992) for the executives and was subsequently signed to the label. They assigned her to work with producer Eric Foster White for a month; he reportedly shaped her voice from a "lower and less poppy" delivery to "distinctively, unmistakably Britney". After hearing the recorded material, president Clive Calder ordered a full album. Spears had originally envisioned "Sheryl Crow music, but younger; more adult contemporary". She felt secure with her label's appointment of producers, since "[i]t made more sense to go pop, because I can dance to it—it's more me." She flew to Cheiron Studios in Stockholm, Sweden, where half of the album was recorded from March to April 1998, with producers Max Martin, Denniz Pop, and Rami Yacoub, among others.

=== 1998–2000: ...Baby One More Time and Oops!... I Did It Again ===
After returning to the US, Spears toured shopping malls as part of her L'Oreal Hair Zone Mall Tour to promote her upcoming debut album. Her show was a four-song set, and she was accompanied by two backup dancers. Her first concert tour followed, as an opening act for NSYNC. Jive released her debut album ...Baby One More Time in January 1999. It debuted at number one on Billboard 200 and was certified two-times platinum by the Recording Industry Association of America (RIAA) after a month. The album topped the charts in fifteen countries and sold over 10 million copies in a year. It became the biggest-selling album ever by a teenage artist.

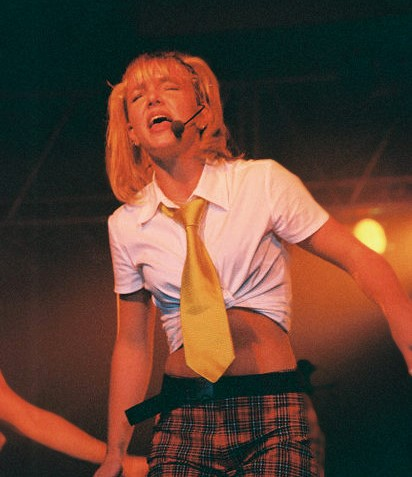
Spears performing during her L'Oreal Hair Zone Mall Tour in 1998

"...Baby One More Time" was released as the lead single from the album in September 1998. Jive originally wanted the associated music video to be animated, but Spears instead suggested the final concept of a Catholic schoolgirl. The single peaked at number one on the Billboard Hot 100, topping the chart for two consecutive weeks in January–February 1999. It sold more than 10 million copies, making it one of the best-selling singles in history. The title track also topped the singles chart for two weeks in the UK and became the fastest-selling single ever by a female artist, shipping over 460,000 copies. It would later become the 25th-most successful song in British chart history. Spears is the youngest female artist to have a million seller in the UK. The album's third single, "(You Drive Me) Crazy", became a top-ten hit worldwide and further propelled the success of the ...Baby One More Time album; the single would later appear in the John Schultz film Drive Me Crazy that year. The album has sold 30 million copies worldwide, making it one of the best-selling albums of all time. It is the best-selling debut album by any artist.

In June 1999, Spears began her first headlining ...Baby One More Time Tour in North America, which was positively received by critics. It also generated some controversy due to her racy outfits. An extension of the tour, titled (You Drive Me) Crazy Tour, followed in March 2000. Spears premiered songs from her upcoming second album during the show.

Oops!... I Did It Again, Spears's second Jive album, was released in May 2000. It debuted at number one in the US, selling 1.3 million copies, breaking the Nielsen SoundScan record for the highest debut sales by any solo artist. It has sold over 20 million copies worldwide to date, making it one of the best-selling albums of all time. Rob Sheffield of Rolling Stone said that "the great thing about Oops! – under the cheese surface, Britney's demand for satisfaction is complex, fierce and downright scary, making her a true child of rock & roll tradition". The album's lead single, "Oops!... I Did It Again", peaked at the top of the charts in Australia, New Zealand, the United Kingdom, and many other European nations, while the second single, "Lucky", peaked at number one in Austria, Germany, Sweden, and Switzerland.

The same year, Spears embarked on the Oops!... I Did It Again Tour, which grossed $40.9 million; she also published her first memoir, Britney Spears' Heart-to-Heart, written with her mother. On September 7, 2000, Spears performed at the 2000 MTV Video Music Awards. Halfway through the performance, she removed her black suit to reveal a sequined flesh-colored bodysuit, followed by a heavy dance routine. It is noted by critics as the moment that Spears showed signs of becoming a more provocative performer. Amidst media speculation, Spears confirmed she was dating NSYNC member Justin Timberlake. Spears and Timberlake both graduated via distance learning from the University of Nebraska High School. She also bought a home in Destin, Florida. In her 2023 memoir, Spears revealed that she had an abortion in late 2000 while dating Timberlake after he said they were not prepared for parenthood. Spears called the abortion "one of the most agonizing things I have ever experienced".

=== 2001–2002: Britney and Crossroads ===
In January 2001, Spears hosted the 28th Annual American Music Awards, starred at Rock in Rio alongside NSYNC, and performed as a special guest in the Super Bowl XXXV halftime show headlined by Aerosmith and NSYNC. In February 2001, she signed a $7–8 million promotional deal with Pepsi and released another book co-written with her mother, A Mother's Gift. Her third studio album, Britney, was released in November 2001, with a funkier sound inspired by hip-hop artists such as Jay-Z and the Neptunes. Britney debuted at number one on the Billboard 200 and reached top five positions in Australia, the UK, and mainland Europe, and has sold 10 million copies worldwide.

Stephen Thomas Erlewine of AllMusic called Britney "the record where she strives to deepen her persona, making it more adult while still recognizably Britney. [...] it does sound like the work of a star who has now found and refined her voice, resulting in her best record yet". It was nominated for the Grammy Awards for Best Pop Vocal Album and Best Female Pop Vocal Performance for "Overprotected", and in 2007 it was named one of the best albums of the preceding 25 years by Entertainment Weekly. The lead single, "I'm a Slave 4 U", became a top-ten hit in several countries.

Spears's performance of the single at the 2001 MTV Video Music Awards featured a caged tiger (wrangled by Bhagavan Antle) and a large albino python draped over her shoulders. It was harshly received by animal rights organization PETA, who claimed the animals were mistreated and scrapped plans for an anti-fur billboard that was to feature Spears. Jocelyn Vena of MTV News summarized Spears's performance: "Draping herself in a white python and slithering around a steamy garden setting – surrounded by dancers in zebra and tiger outfits – Spears created one of the most striking visuals in the 27-year history of the show."

To support the album, Spears began the Dream Within a Dream Tour. The show was critically praised for its technical innovations, the pièce de résistance being a water screen that pumped two tons of water into the stage. The tour grossed $53.3 million, becoming the second highest-grossing tour of 2002 by a female artist, behind Cher's Farewell Tour. Her career success was highlighted by Forbes in 2002, as Spears was ranked the world's most powerful celebrity. Spears also landed her first starring role in Crossroads, released in February 2002. Although the film was largely panned, critics praised Spears's acting. The film was a box office success, grossing over $61.1 million worldwide on a $12 million budget.

In June 2002, Spears opened her first restaurant, Nyla, in New York City, but terminated her relationship in November due to mismanagement and "management's failure to keep her fully apprised". The following month, Spears announced she would take a six-month break from her career; however, she went back into the studio in November to record her new album. Spears's relationship with Justin Timberlake ended after three years. In November 2002, Timberlake released the song "Cry Me a River". Its music video featured a Spears look-alike and fueled rumors that she had been engaging in an affair, fueled by further rumors of possible relationships involving Timberlake's choreographer Wade Robson and Limp Bizkit's frontman Fred Durst. Spears had initially denied the allegations of a possible affair involving Durst, despite the two being spotted together on multiple occasions, even claiming the two had a friendly connection. In 2023, she admitted to an affair with Robson. As a response, Spears wrote the ballad "Everytime" with her backing vocalist and friend Annet Artani.

=== 2003–2005: In the Zone and first two marriages ===
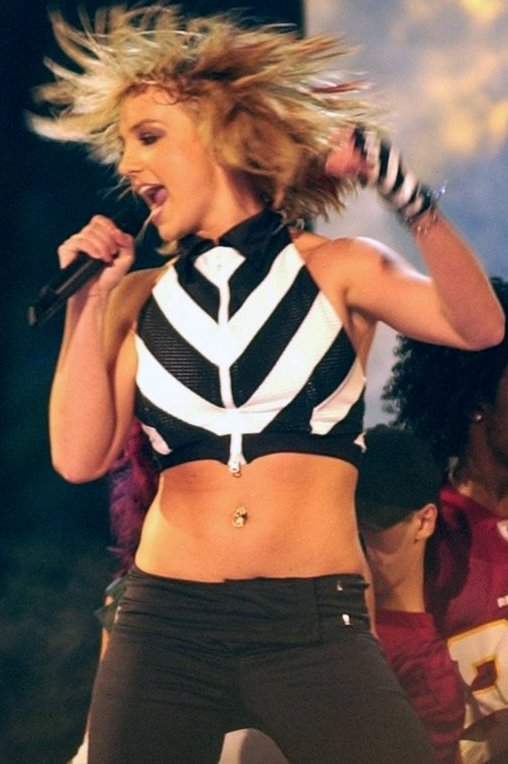
Spears performing at the NFL Kickoff Live in September 2003

In August 2003, Spears opened the MTV Video Music Awards with Christina Aguilera, performing "Like a Virgin". Halfway through, they were joined by Madonna, whom they both kissed. The incident was highly publicized. In 2008, MTV listed the performance as the number-one opening moment in the history of the MTV Video Music Awards, while Blender cited it as one of the 25 sexiest music moments in television history.

Spears released her fourth studio album, In the Zone, in November 2003. She assumed more creative control by writing and co-producing most of the material. Vibe called it "a supremely confident dance record that also illustrates Spears's development as a songwriter". NPR named it one of the most important recordings of the decade, writing that "the decade's history of impeccably crafted pop is written on her body of work". In the Zone sold over 609,000 copies during its first week of availability in the United States, debuting at the top of the charts, making Spears the first female artist in the SoundScan era to have her first four studio albums debut at number one. It also debuted at the top of the charts in France and in the top ten in Belgium, Denmark, Sweden, and the Netherlands. The album produced four singles: "Me Against the Music", a collaboration with Madonna; "Toxic"—which won Spears her first Grammy for Best Dance Recording; "Everytime", and "Outrageous".

In January 2004, Spears married her childhood friend Jason Allen Alexander at A Little White Wedding Chapel in Las Vegas, Nevada. The marriage was annulled 55 hours later, following a petition to the court that stated that Spears "lacked understanding of her actions".

In March 2004, Spears embarked on the Onyx Hotel Tour in support of In the Zone. The tour was canceled in June 2004, when she fell and injured her left knee during the music video shoot for "Outrageous". She underwent arthroscopic surgery and wore a thigh brace for six weeks, followed by eight to twelve weeks of rehabilitation. That year, Spears became involved in the Kabbalah Centre through her friendship with Madonna.

In July 2004, Spears became engaged to struggling dancer Kevin Federline, whom she had met three months earlier. The romance was the subject of intense media attention, since Federline had recently broken up with actress Shar Jackson, who was still pregnant with their second child at the time. The stages of their relationship were chronicled in Spears's first reality show, Britney and Kevin: Chaotic, which premiered on May 17, 2005, on UPN. Spears later referred to the show in a 2013 interview as "probably the worst thing I've done in my career". They held a wedding ceremony on September 18, 2004, but were not legally married until October 6 due to a delay finalizing the couple's prenuptial agreement.

Shortly after, she released her first perfume, Curious, with Elizabeth Arden, which broke the company's first-week gross for a perfume. In October 2004, Spears took a career break to start a family. Greatest Hits: My Prerogative, her first greatest hits compilation album, was released in November 2004. Spears's cover version of Bobby Brown's "My Prerogative" was released as the lead single from the album, reaching the top of the charts in Finland, Ireland, Italy, and Norway. The second single, "Do Somethin'", was a top ten hit in Australia, the United Kingdom, and other countries of mainland Europe. In August 2005, Spears released "Someday (I Will Understand)", which was dedicated to her first son, who was born the following month. In November 2005, she released her first remix compilation, B in the Mix: The Remixes, which consists of 11 remixes.

=== 2006–2007: Personal struggles and Blackout ===
In February 2006, pictures surfaced of Spears driving with her son on her lap instead of in a car seat. Child advocates were horrified by the photos of her holding the wheel with one hand and him with the other. Spears attributed the situation to a frightening encounter with paparazzi, and that it was a mistake on her part. The following month, she guest-starred on the Will & Grace episode "Buy, Buy Baby" as closeted lesbian Amber-Louise. She announced she no longer studied Kabbalah in May 2006, explaining, "my baby is my religion". Spears posed nude for the August 2006 cover of Harper's Bazaar; the photograph was compared to Demi Moore's 1991 Vanity Fair cover. In September 2006, her second son was born. Two months later, Spears filed for divorce from Federline, citing irreconcilable differences. Their divorce was finalized in July 2007, when the two reached a settlement and agreed to share joint custody of their sons.

Spears's maternal aunt, Sandra Bridges Covington, with whom she had been very close, died of ovarian cancer in January 2007. In February, Spears stayed in a drug rehabilitation facility in Antigua for less than a day. The following night, she shaved her head with electric clippers at a hair salon in Tarzana, Los Angeles. She admitted herself to other treatment facilities during the following weeks. In May 2007, she produced a series of promotional concerts at House of Blues venues, titled The M+M's Tour. In October 2007, Spears lost physical custody of her sons to Federline. The reasons for the court ruling were not revealed to the public. Spears was also sued by Louis Vuitton over her 2005 music video "Do Somethin'" for upholstering her Hummer interior in counterfeit Louis Vuitton cherry blossom fabric, which resulted in the video being banned on European TV stations.

In October 2007, Spears released her fifth studio album, Blackout. The album debuted atop the charts in Canada and Ireland, at number two in the US, France, Japan, Mexico, and the United Kingdom, and the top ten in Australia, South Korea, New Zealand, and many European nations. In the United States, it was Spears's first album not to debut at number one, although, she did become the only female artist to have her first five studio albums debut at the two top slots of the chart. The album received positive reviews from critics and had sold 3.1 million copies worldwide by the end of 2008. Blackout won Album of the Year at the 2008 MTV Europe Music Awards and was listed as the fifth Best Pop Album of the Decade by The Times.

Spears performed the lead single, "Gimme More", at the 2007 MTV Video Music Awards. The performance was widely panned by critics. Despite the criticism, the single enjoyed worldwide success, peaking at number one in Canada and within the top ten in almost every country it charted. The second single, "Piece of Me", reached the top of the charts in Ireland and reached the top five in Australia, Canada, Denmark, New Zealand, and the United Kingdom. The third single, "Break the Ice", was released the following year, and reached numbers seven and nine in Ireland and Canada, respectively. In December 2007, Spears began a relationship with paparazzo Adnan Ghalib.

=== 2008–2010: Conservatorship and Circus ===
In January 2008, after Spears refused to relinquish custody of her sons to Federline's representatives, she was institutionalized at Cedars-Sinai Medical Center due to her worsening mental condition. Her visitation rights were suspended at an emergency court hearing, and Federline was given sole custody. By the end of the month, she was put on a 5150 involuntary psychiatric hold at Ronald Reagan UCLA Medical Center. In February, her father Jamie filed a temporary conservatorship suit, granting him and attorney Andrew Wallet temporary control over her affairs. The following month, Spears guest-starred on the How I Met Your Mother episode "Ten Sessions" as a receptionist. Her performance drew positive reviews and brought the series its highest ratings ever. In July 2008, Spears regained some visitation rights after coming to an agreement with Federline.

In September 2008, Spears opened the MTV Video Music Awards with a pre-taped comedy sketch with Jonah Hill and an introduction speech. She won Best Female Video, Best Pop Video, and Video of the Year for "Piece of Me". A 60-minute introspective documentary, Britney: For the Record, was produced to chronicle Spears's return to the recording industry. Directed by Phil Griffin, For the Record was shot in Beverly Hills, Hollywood, and New York City during the third quarter of 2008. The documentary was broadcast on MTV to 5.6 million viewers for the two airings on the premiere night, December 1. It was the highest rating in its Sunday night time slot and in the network's history.

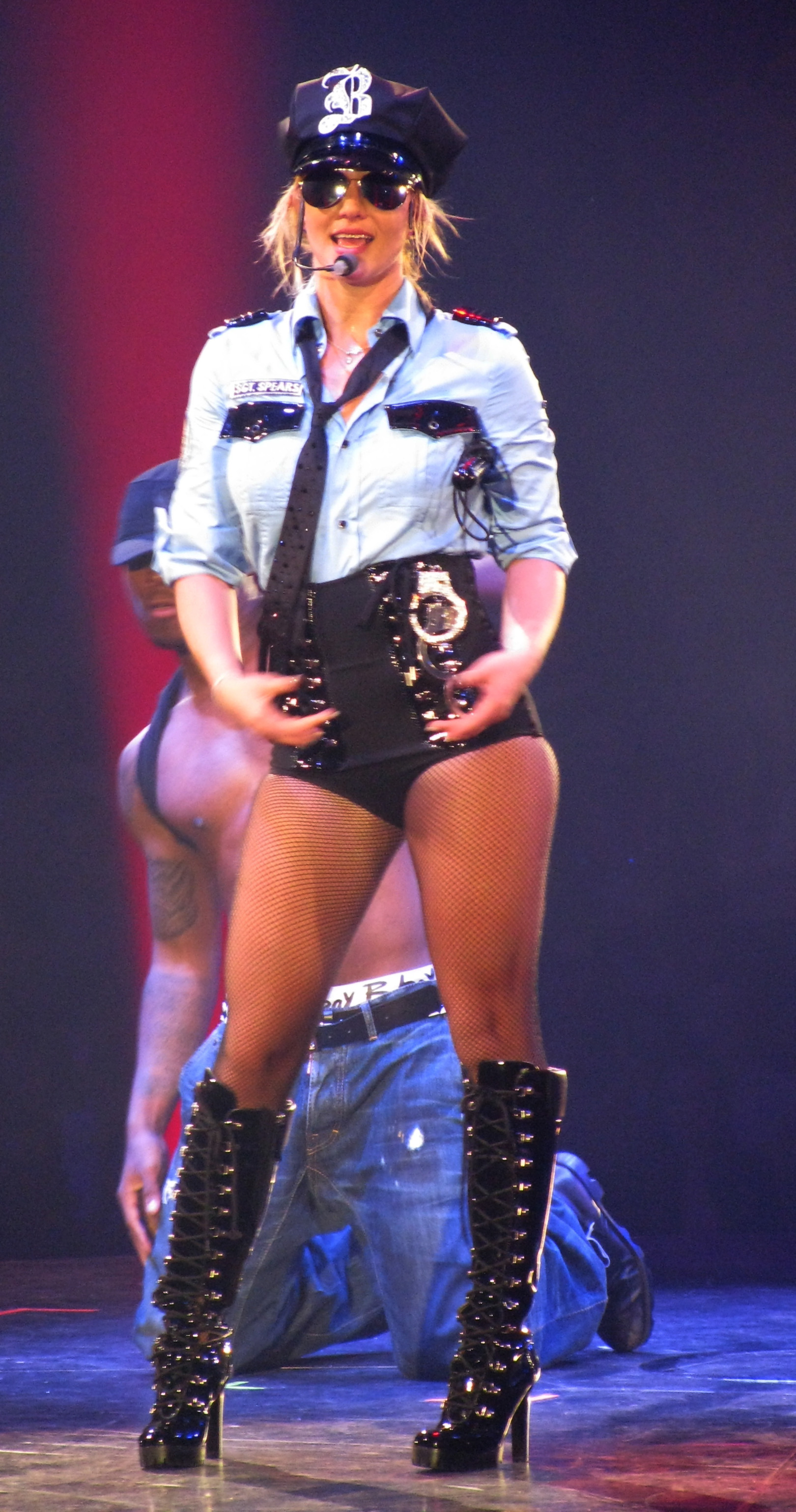
Spears performing on the Circus Starring Britney Spears tour, March 2009

Spears's sixth studio album, Circus, was released in December 2008, two months after her conservatorship was extended indefinitely. It received positive reviews from critics and debuted at number one in Canada, the Czech Republic, and the United States, and within the top ten in many European nations. In the United States, Spears became the youngest female artist to have five albums debut at number one, earning a place in Guinness World Records. (Justin Bieber is the youngest male artist to do so, at age 18.) She also became the only act in the SoundScan era to have four albums debut with 500,000 or more copies sold. The album was one of the fastest-selling albums of the year and has sold 4 million copies worldwide. Its lead single, "Womanizer", became Spears's first chart-topper on the Billboard Hot 100 since "...Baby One More Time". The single also topped the charts in Belgium, Canada, Denmark, Finland, France, Norway, and Sweden. It was also nominated for the Grammy Award for Best Dance Recording.

In January 2009, Spears and Jamie obtained a restraining order against her former manager Sam Lutfi, ex-boyfriend Adnan Ghalib, and attorney Jon Eardley, who were accused of conspiring to gain control of Spears's affairs. Spears began the Circus Starring Britney Spears tour that March. With a gross of US $131.8 million, it became the fifth highest-grossing tour of the year. In November 2009, Spears released her second greatest hits album, The Singles Collection. The album's only single, "3", became her third number-one single in the US.

In May 2010, Spears's representatives confirmed she was dating her agent, Jason Trawick, and that they had decided to end their professional relationship to focus on their personal relationship. Spears designed a limited edition clothing line for Candie's, which was released in stores in July 2010. In September 2010, she made a cameo appearance on a Spears-themed tribute episode of the television series Glee, titled "Britney/Brittany". The episode drew the series's highest Nielsen rating so far in the 18–49 demographic.

=== 2011–2012: Femme Fatale and The X Factor ===
In March 2011, Spears released her seventh studio album, Femme Fatale. The album peaked at number one in the United States, Canada, and Australia, and within the top ten on nearly every other chart. Its peak in the United States tied Spears with Mariah Carey and Janet Jackson for the third-most number ones among women. Femme Fatale has been certified platinum by the RIAA and, as of February 2014, had sold 2.4 million copies worldwide.

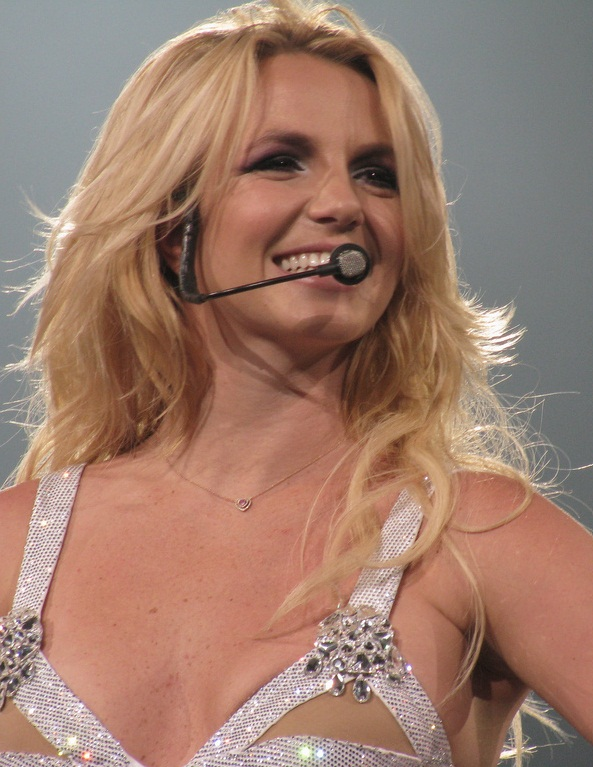
Spears performing on her Femme Fatale Tour, July 2011

The album's lead single, "Hold It Against Me", debuted atop the Billboard Hot 100, becoming Spears's fourth number-one single on the chart and making her the second artist in history to have two consecutive singles debut at number one, after Mariah Carey. The second single, "Till the World Ends", peaked at number three on the Billboard Hot 100 in May, while the third single, "I Wanna Go", reached number seven in August. Femme Fatale became Spears's first album to have three of its songs reach the top ten on that chart. The fourth and final single, "Criminal", was released in September 2011. The music video sparked controversy when British politicians criticized Spears for using replica guns while filming the video in a London area that had been badly affected by the 2011 England riots. Spears's management briefly responded, stating, "The video is a fantasy story featuring Britney's boyfriend, Jason Trawick, which literally plays out the lyrics of a song written three years before the riots ever happened." In April 2011, Spears appeared in a remix of Rihanna's song "S&M". It reached number one in the US later that month, giving Spears her fifth number one on the chart. On Billboard's 2011 Year-End list, Spears was ranked number fourteen on the Artists of the Year, thirty-two on Billboard 200 artists, and ten on Billboard Hot 100 artists. Spears co-wrote "Whiplash", a song from the album When the Sun Goes Down (2011) by Selena Gomez & the Scene.

In June 2011, Spears embarked on her Femme Fatale Tour. The first ten dates of the tour grossed $6.2 million, and the tour peaked at number 55 on Pollstar's Top 100 North American Tours list for the halfway point of the year. The tour ended on December 10, 2011, in Puerto Rico, after 79 performances. A DVD of the tour was released in November 2011. In August 2011, Spears received the Michael Jackson Video Vanguard Award at the 2011 MTV Video Music Awards. Two months later, she released her second remix album, B in the Mix: The Remixes Vol. 2. In December 2011, Spears became engaged to Trawick.

In May, Spears replaced Nicole Scherzinger as a judge for the second season of the American version of The X Factor, joining Simon Cowell, L.A. Reid, and fellow new judge Demi Lovato, who replaced Paula Abdul. With a reported salary of $15 million, she became the highest-paid judge on a singing competition series in television history. However, Katy Perry broke her record in 2018 after Perry was signed for a $25 million salary to serve as a judge on ABC's revival of American Idol. Spears mentored the Teens category; her final contestant, Carly Rose Sonenclar, was named the runner-up of the season. After Spears decided not to return, Paulina Rubio was hired as her permanent replacement for the show's third and final season.

That year, Spears collaborated with will.i.am on "Scream & Shout", released as the third single from his fourth studio album, #willpower (2013). The song later became Spears's sixth number-one single on the UK Singles Chart and peaked at number three on the Billboard Hot 100. "Scream & Shout" was among the best-selling songs of 2012 and 2013, with denoting sales of over 8.1 million worldwide. The accompanying music video was the third most-viewed in 2013 on Vevo, despite being released in 2012. In December 2012, Forbes named her music's top-earning woman of 2012, with estimated earnings of $58 million.

=== 2013–2015: Britney Jean and Britney: Piece of Me ===
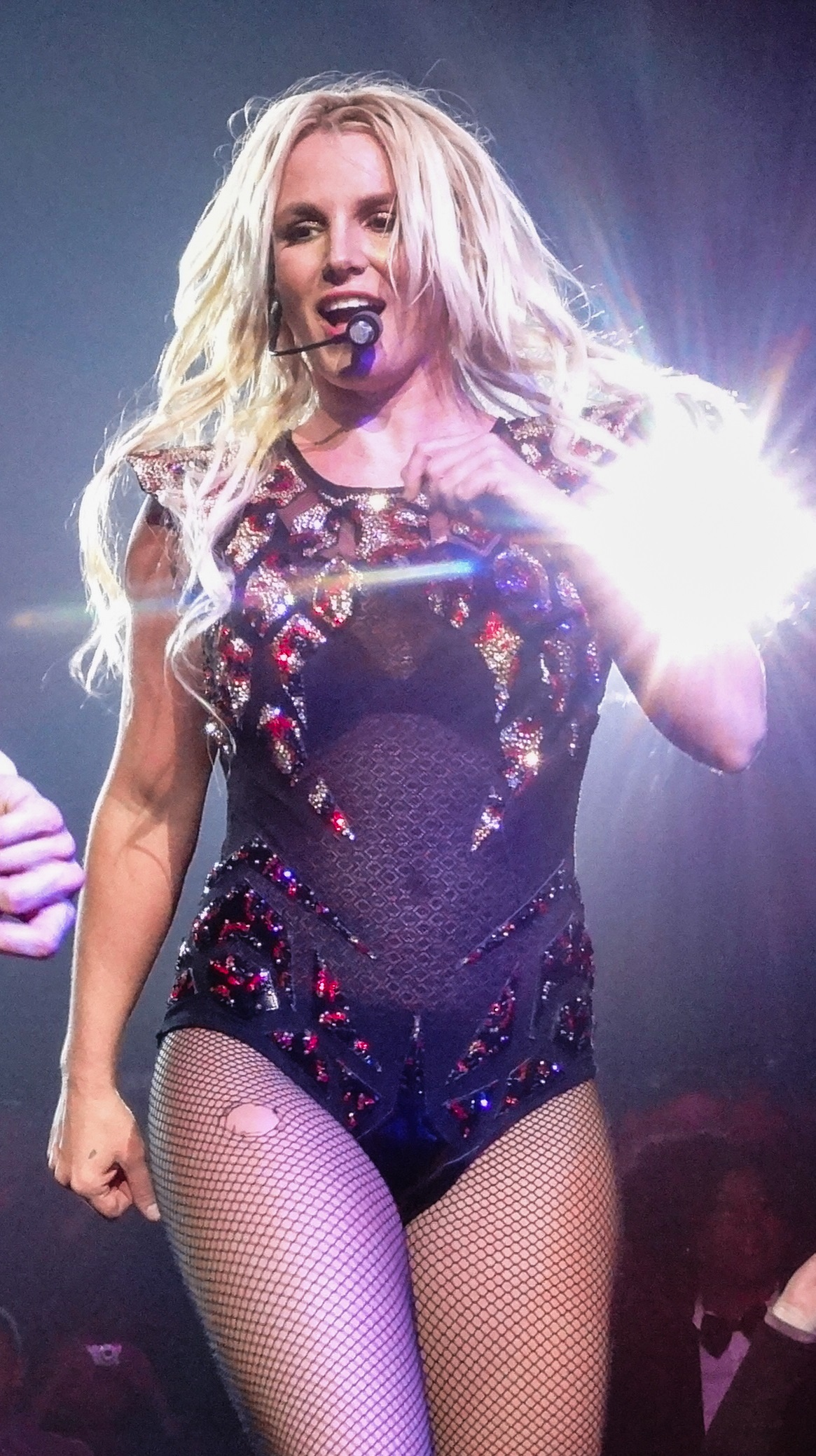
Spears performing in 2014 during Britney: Piece of Me, a four-year concert residency in Las Vegas

Spears began production on her eighth studio album, Britney Jean, in December 2012 and enlisted will.i.am as its executive producer in May 2013. In January 2013, Spears and Jason Trawick ended their engagement. Trawick was also removed as Spears's co-conservator, restoring her father as the sole conservator. Following the breakup, she began dating David Lucado in March; the couple split in August 2014. During the production of Britney Jean, Spears recorded the song "Ooh La La" for the soundtrack of The Smurfs 2, which was released in June 2013.

On September 17, 2013, she appeared on Good Morning America to announce her two-year concert residency at Planet Hollywood Resort & Casino in Las Vegas, titled Britney: Piece of Me. It began on December 27, 2013, and included a total of 100 shows throughout 2014 and 2015. During the same appearance, Spears announced that Britney Jean would be released on December 3, 2013, in the United States. It was released through RCA Records due to the disbandment of Jive Records in 2011, which had formed the joint RCA/Jive Label Group (initially known as BMG Label Group) between 2007 and 2011.

Britney Jean became Spears's final project under her original recording contract with Jive, which had guaranteed the release of eight studio albums. The record received a low amount of promotion and had little commercial impact, reportedly due to time conflicts involving preparations for Britney: Piece of Me. Upon its release, the record debuted at number four on the US Billboard 200 with first-week sales of 107,000 copies, becoming her lowest-peaking and lowest-selling album in the United States. It was also her lowest-charting and lowest-selling album in the UK, debuting at number 34 on the UK Albums Chart, selling 12,959 copies in its first week.

"Work Bitch" was released as the lead single from Britney Jean in September 2013. It debuted and peaked at number 12 on the US Billboard Hot 100, marking Spears's 31st entry on the chart, the fifth-highest debut of her career on the chart, and her seventh in the top 20. It also marked Spears's 19th top-20 entry and her 23rd top-40 single overall. It was her highest-sales debut since her 2011 number-one single "Hold It Against Me". "Work Bitch" debuted and peaked at number seven on the UK Singles Chart. The song also peaked within the top ten of the charts in Brazil, Canada, France, Italy, Mexico, and Spain.

The second single, "Perfume", premiered in November 2013. It debuted and peaked at number 76 on the US Billboard Hot 100. In October 2013, Spears was featured as a guest vocalist on the song "SMS (Bangerz)" by Miley Cyrus, from the latter's fourth studio album, Bangerz (2013). On January 8, 2014, Spears won Favorite Pop Artist at the 40th People's Choice Awards at the Microsoft Theater in Los Angeles. In August 2014, Spears confirmed she had renewed her contract with RCA and that she was writing and recording new music for her next album.

Spears announced via Twitter in August 2014 that she would be releasing an intimate apparel line called "The Intimate Britney Spears". It was available to be purchased beginning on September 9, 2014, in the United States and Canada through Spears's Intimate Collection website. It was available on September 25 for purchase in Europe. The company now ships to over 200 countries, including Australia and New Zealand. On September 25, 2014, Spears confirmed on Good Morning Britain that she extended her contract to perform her Britney: Piece of Me concert residency at Planet Hollywood Las Vegas for two additional years. Spears began dating television producer Charlie Ebersol in October 2014. The pair split in June 2015.

On May 14, 2015, Spears released a single, "Pretty Girls", with Iggy Azalea. It reached number 29 on the Billboard Hot 100. Spears and Azalea performed the track live at the 2015 Billboard Music Awards from The AXIS, the home of Spears's residency, to positive critical response. Entertainment Weekly praised the performance, noting "Spears gave one of her most energetic televised performances in years."

On June 16, 2015, Giorgio Moroder released the album Déjà Vu, which featured Spears on "Tom's Diner". The song was released as the fourth single from the album on October 9, 2015. In an interview, Moroder praised Spears's vocals and said she "sounds so good that you would hardly recognize her". At the 2015 Teen Choice Awards, Spears received the Candie's Style Icon Award, her ninth Teen Choice Award. In November 2015, Spears guest-starred as a fictionalized version of herself on the CW series Jane the Virgin. On the show, she danced to "Toxic" with Gina Rodriguez's character.

=== 2016–2018: Glory, continued residency, and the Piece of Me Tour ===
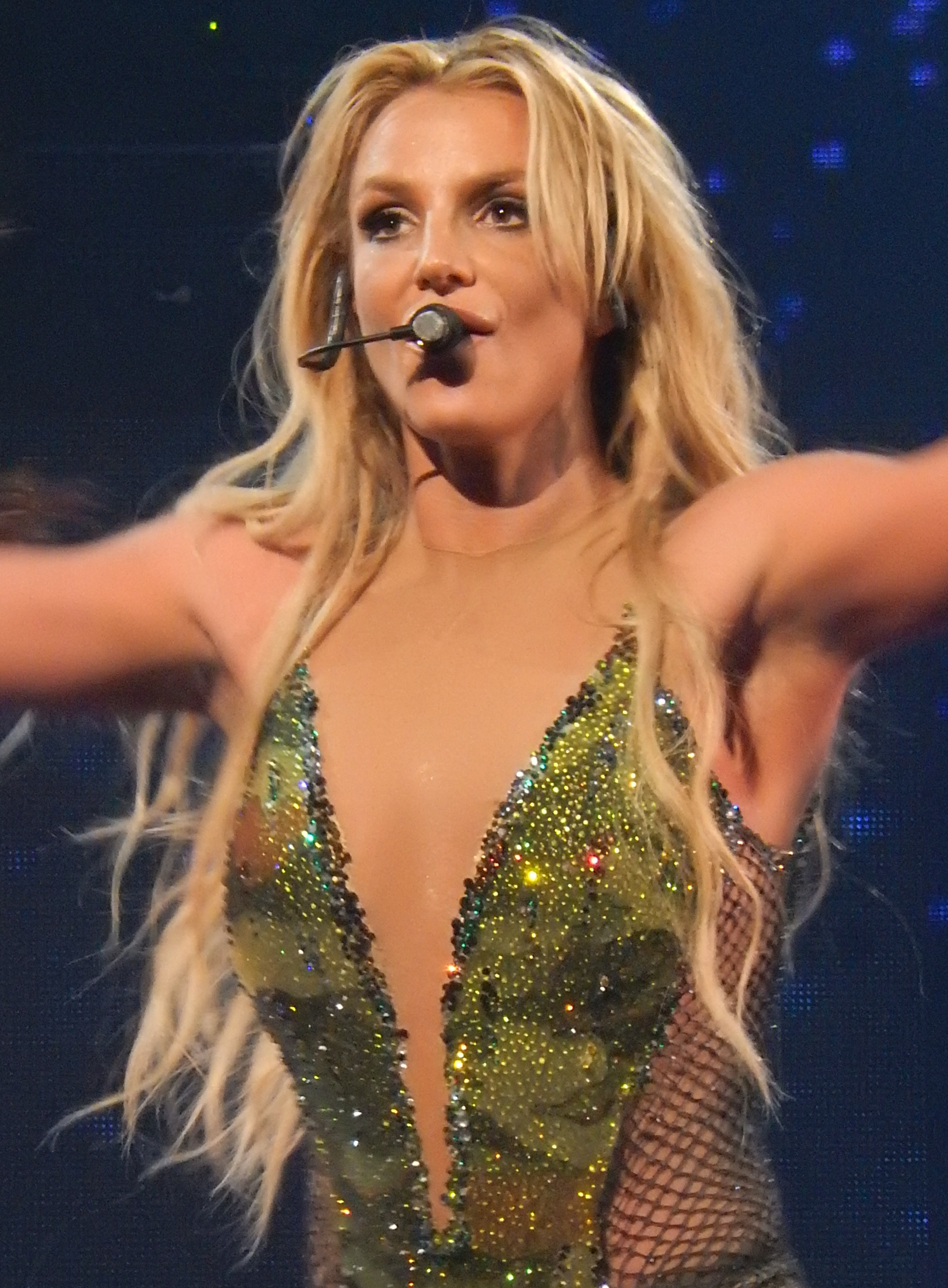
Spears performing during the Apple Music Festival at the Roundhouse in London in September 2016

In November 2015, Spears confirmed via social media that she had begun recording her ninth studio album. On March 1, 2016, V announced that Spears would appear on the cover of its 100th issue, dated March 8, 2016, in addition to revealing three different covers shot by photographer Mario Testino for the milestone publication. The V editor-in-chief, Stephen Gan, said Spears was selected because of her status as an icon in the industry, and asked: "Who in our world did not grow up listening to her music?" In May 2016, Spears launched a casual role-play gaming application, Britney Spears: American Dream. The app, created by Glu Mobile, was made available through both iOS and Google Play.

On May 22, 2016, Spears performed a medley of her past singles at the 2016 Billboard Music Awards. In addition to opening the show, Spears was honored with the Billboard Millennium Award. On July 15, 2016, Spears released the lead single, "Make Me", from her forthcoming album, featuring guest vocals from American rapper G-Eazy. The album, Glory, was formally released on August 26, 2016. On August 16, 2016, MTV and Spears announced that she would perform at the 2016 MTV Video Music Awards. The performance marked Spears's first time returning to the VMA stage after her widely panned performance of "Gimme More" at the 2007 show nine years earlier. Along with "Make Me", Spears and G-Eazy also performed the latter's hit song "Me, Myself & I".

Spears appeared on the cover of Marie Claire UK for the October 2016 issue. In the publication, Spears revealed that she had suffered from crippling anxiety in the past, and that motherhood played a major role in helping her overcome it. "My boys don't care if everything isn't perfect. They don't judge me", Spears said in the issue. In November 2016, during an interview with Las Vegas Blog, Spears confirmed she had already begun work on her next album, stating: "I'm not sure what I want the next album to sound like... I just know that I'm excited to get into the studio again and actually have already been back recording." In the same month, she released a remix version of "Slumber Party" as the second single from Glory, featuring Tinashe.

She began dating "Slumber Party"'s music video co-star Sam Asghari after the two met on set. In January 2017, Spears received four wins out of four nominations at the 43rd People's Choice Awards, including Favorite Pop Artist, Female Artist, Social Media Celebrity, as well as Comedic Collaboration for a skit with Ellen DeGeneres for The Ellen DeGeneres Show. In March 2017, Spears announced that her residency concert would be performed abroad as a world tour, Britney: Live in Concert, with dates in select Asian cities. In April 2017, the Israeli Labor Party announced that it would reschedule its July primary election to avoid conflict with Spears's sold-out Tel Aviv concert, citing traffic and security concerns.

Spears's manager Larry Rudolph also announced the residency would not be extended following her contract expiration with Caesars Entertainment at the end of 2017. On April 29, 2017, Spears became the first recipient of the Icon Award at the 2017 Radio Disney Music Awards. On November 4, 2017, Spears attended the grand opening of the Nevada Childhood Cancer Foundation Britney Spears Campus in Las Vegas. Later that month, Forbes announced that Spears was the eighth-highest-earning female musician, earning $34 million in 2017. On December 31, 2017, Spears performed the final show of Britney: Piece of Me. The final performance reportedly brought in $1.172 million, setting a new box office record for a single show in Las Vegas, a record previously held by Jennifer Lopez. Performances of "Toxic" and "Work Bitch" were recorded on earlier dates and aired on ABC's Dick Clark's New Year's Rockin' Eve to a record audience of 25.6 million.

In January 2018, Spears released her 24th perfume with Elizabeth Arden, Sunset Fantasy, and announced the Piece of Me Tour, which took place in July 2018 in North America and Europe. Tickets were sold out within minutes for major cities, and additional dates were added to meet the demand. Pitbull was the supporting act for the European leg. The tour ranked at 86 in North America and 30 worldwide on Pollstar's 2018 Year-End Top 100 Tours chart. In total, the tour grossed $54.3 million, with 260,531 tickets sold, and was the sixth-highest-grossing female tour of 2018. It was also the United Kingdom's second-best-selling female tour of 2018.

On March 20, 2018, Spears was announced as part of a campaign for French luxury fashion house Kenzo. The company said it aimed to shake up the "jungle" world of fashion with Spears's "La Collection Memento No. 2" campaign. On April 12, 2018, Spears was honored with the 2018 GLAAD Vanguard Award at the GLAAD Media Awards for her role in "accelerating acceptance for the LGBTQ community". On April 27, 2018, Epic Rights announced a new partnership with Spears to debut her own fashion line in 2019, which would include clothing, fitness apparel, accessories, and electronics.

In July 2018, Spears released her first unisex fragrance, Prerogative. On October 18, 2018, Spears announced her second Las Vegas residency show, Britney: Domination, which was set to launch at Park MGM's Park Theatre on February 13, 2019. Spears was slated to make $507,000 per show, which would have made her the highest paid act on the Las Vegas Strip. On October 21, 2018, Spears performed at the Formula One Grand Prix in Austin, the final performance of her Piece of Me Tour.

=== 2019–2021: Conservatorship dispute, #FreeBritney, and abuse allegations ===
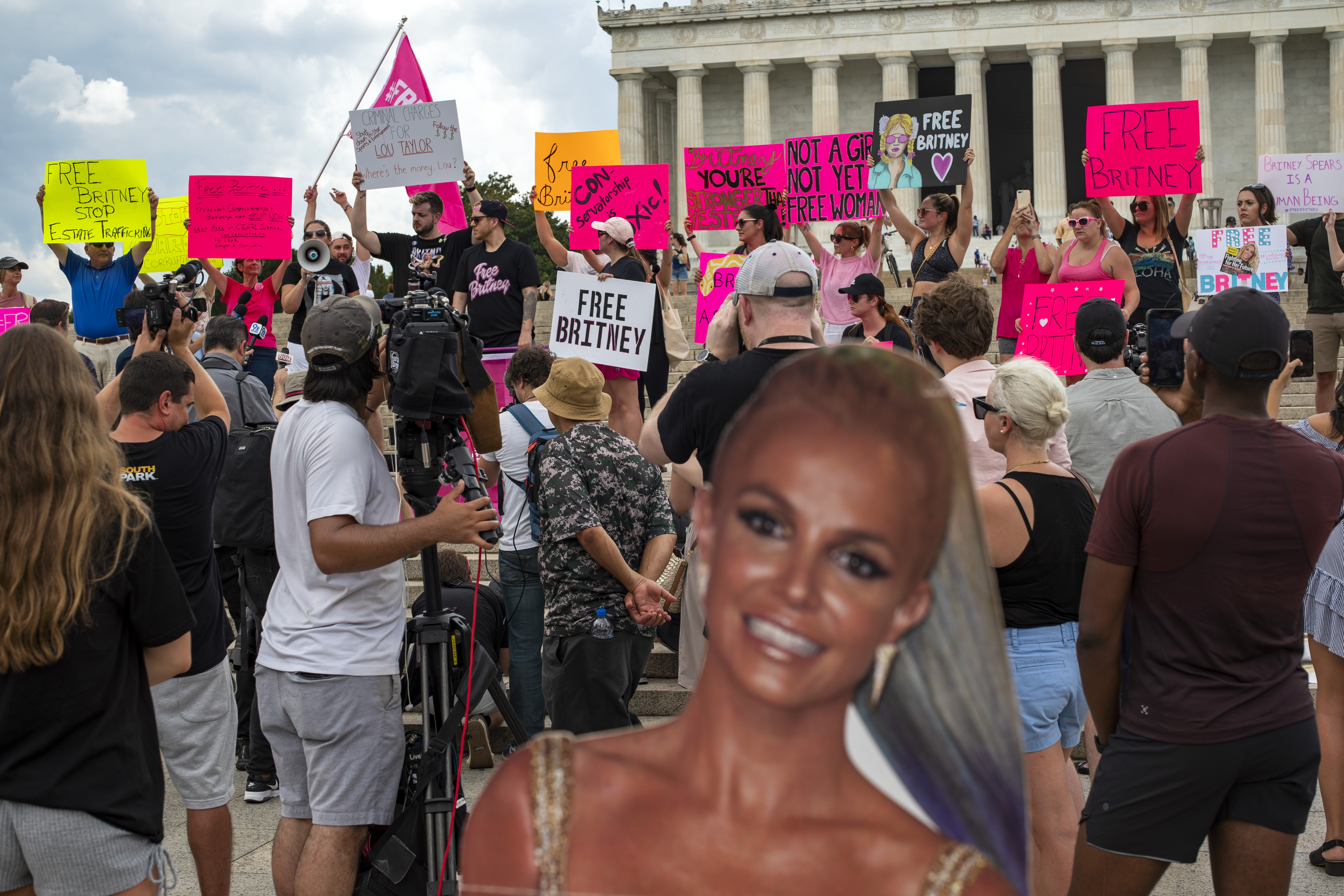
The #FreeBritney movement in front of the Lincoln Memorial, 2021

By early 2019, Spears announced an indefinite hiatus and the cancellation of her Las Vegas residency after her father, Jamie, suffered a near-fatal colon rupture and Andrew Wallet resigned as co-conservator of her estate. Following allegations of Jamie's involvement in cancelling Spears's residency and placing her in a psychiatric facility, a movement titled #FreeBritney was organized in May 2019. Judge Brenda Penny announced a professional evaluation of the conservatorship that month. That September, Kevin Federline filed a restraining order against Jamie following an alleged physical altercation between Jamie and one of her sons.

An interactive pop-up museum dedicated to Spears, dubbed "The Zone", opened in Los Angeles in February 2020, though it was later suspended due to the COVID-19 pandemic. She released Glory's Japanese-exclusive bonus track, "Mood Ring" as a single, and debuted a new cover of the album to streaming and digital platforms worldwide in May 2020. In December, Spears released an updated deluxe edition of Glory, which includes "Mood Ring" and new songs "Swimming in the Stars" and "Matches", a collaboration with Backstreet Boys.

In February 2021, a television documentary titled Framing Britney Spears aired on FX. That June, The New York Times obtained confidential court documents stating that Spears had pushed for years to end her conservatorship. At the conservatorship hearing, Spears announced her intentions to terminate the conservatorship, citing abuse. In July, Bessemer Trust and Spears's longtime manager Larry Rudolph resigned. Later in the year, Spears announced her engagement to her longtime boyfriend, Sam Asghari. After Jamie filed a suit to end his involvement, Penny terminated Spears's conservatorship in November.

=== 2022–present: Third marriage, The Woman in Me, and retirement from the music industry ===
In April 2022, she announced her pregnancy with Asghari's child, which ended in a miscarriage the following month. The couple married on June 9 at her home in Thousand Oaks, Los Angeles. None of Spears's immediate family (including her parents, sister, and brother) were invited; her two sons did not attend. Spears's ex-husband, Jason Alexander, attempted to crash the wedding by breaking into her home, armed with a knife, but was arrested. A three-year restraining order was subsequently enacted. On August 26, Spears and English musician Elton John released the duet "Hold Me Closer", a remake of John's 1972 single "Tiny Dancer". It was Spears's first musical release since dissolving her conservatorship. "Hold Me Closer" debuted at number six on the US Billboard Hot 100, becoming her 14th top-ten single and her highest-charting song in the chart since "Scream & Shout" (2012). It debuted at number three on the UK Singles Chart, earning Spears her 24th top-ten.

Since her conservatorship's dissolution, Spears's personal life, social media presence, and overall well-being have been subject to renewed media interest and fan speculation, giving rise to conspiracy theories. On January 24, 2023, deputies from the Ventura County Sheriff's Office performed a welfare check at Spears's residence after receiving several calls from fans who were concerned after she deleted her Instagram account. A spokesperson for the Sheriff's Department stated that Spears "was safe and in no danger". Spears addressed the incident on her Twitter account, asking fans to respect her privacy. Spears and the rapper will.i.am released their single, "Mind Your Business", on July 21, 2023. On August 16, it was announced Spears and Asghari separated after 14 months of marriage. On May 1, 2024, they reached a divorce settlement. The following day, the judge signed off on the settlement and the couple were divorced on December 2, 2024. In September 2023, an additional welfare check was initiated when Spears posted an Instagram video of herself dancing with knives. Her security team assured the attending officer that there was no immediate threat to her safety, and the officer departed. Spears also clarified that the knives were not real.

After signing a $15 million book deal in February 2022 in one of the largest deals ever made, she published a second memoir, The Woman in Me, in October 2023. It details her rise to fame, public media events, her conservatorship, and her newfound freedom. In the United States, it sold 1.1 million copies, while worldwide it sold 2.4 million copies in print sales during its first week of release.

In January 2024, reports circulated that Charli XCX and Julia Michaels had been asked to write songs for Spears, and Rolling Stone reported that "management and A&R are trying to get her excited for the music". Spears denied the reports, saying she would never return to the music industry. However, she also said that she had written more than 20 songs for other artists in the previous two years. In May 2024, Charli XCX confirmed in an interview that she had indeed been asked to write for Spears, for which she traveled to Malibu, but that she did not know if Spears was involved, explaining that "the team were present... But she didn't record it. She obviously didn't."

In 2026, she clarified her exit from the music industry, saying that she would "never perform in the US again", but did not rule out performing elsewhere, saying "I hope to be ... performing with my son … in the UK and Australia very soon."

In February 2026, Variety reported that music publisher Primary Wave had acquired the rights to Spears's entire music catalog along with other rights. The BBC reported that the purchase took place on December 30, 2025, for roughly $200 million. The following month, she was arrested in Ventura County, California, on suspicion of driving under the influence. In April, Spears's representative stated that she had checked herself into a rehabilitation facility. On April 30, 2026, she officially received a criminal DUI charge. Spears was scheduled to appear in court for her arraignment hearing May 4, 2026. It had been agreed that Spears could avoid jail time for this charge if she pled guilty to reckless driving, for which she would only get probation and be required to both complete a DUI class and pay state-mandated fines and fees.

On April 30, 2026, Spears checked out of rehab. On May 4, 2026, Spears, who was absent from court during her arraignment hearing and had her defense attorney appear on her behalf, pled guilty in a Ventura County court to one count of reckless driving. She was then sentenced to one year of probation and one day in jail, with credit for the time in jail she served following her March 2026 arrest. In addition, Spears was ordered to meet with a psychologist once a week and a psychiatrist twice a month. She was also fined $571 and is required to attend a three-month DUI program which sees drivers complete 30 hours of class time. As part of her plea deal, Spears' vehicle became authorized to be searched for drugs and alcohol.

== Artistry ==
=== Influences ===
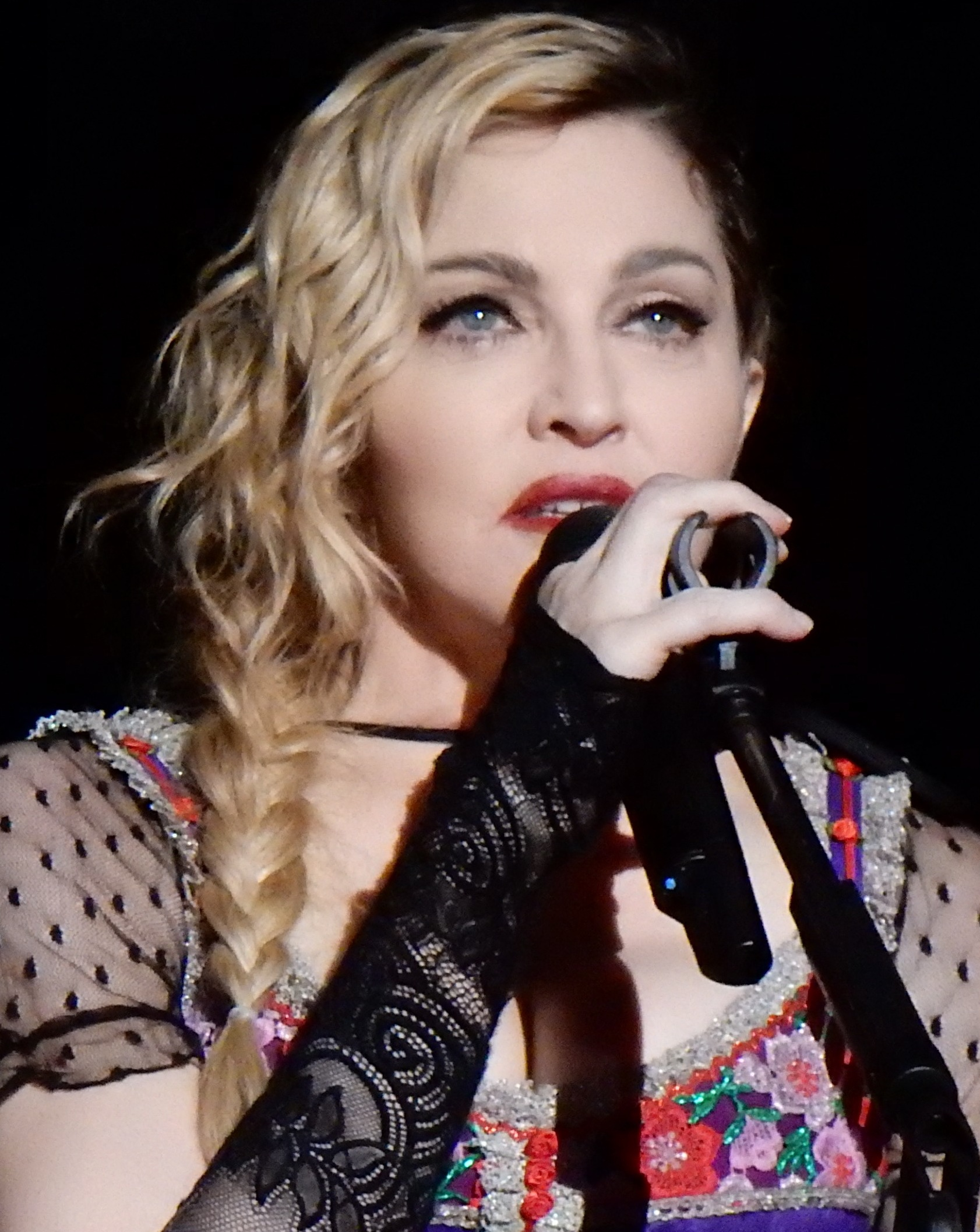
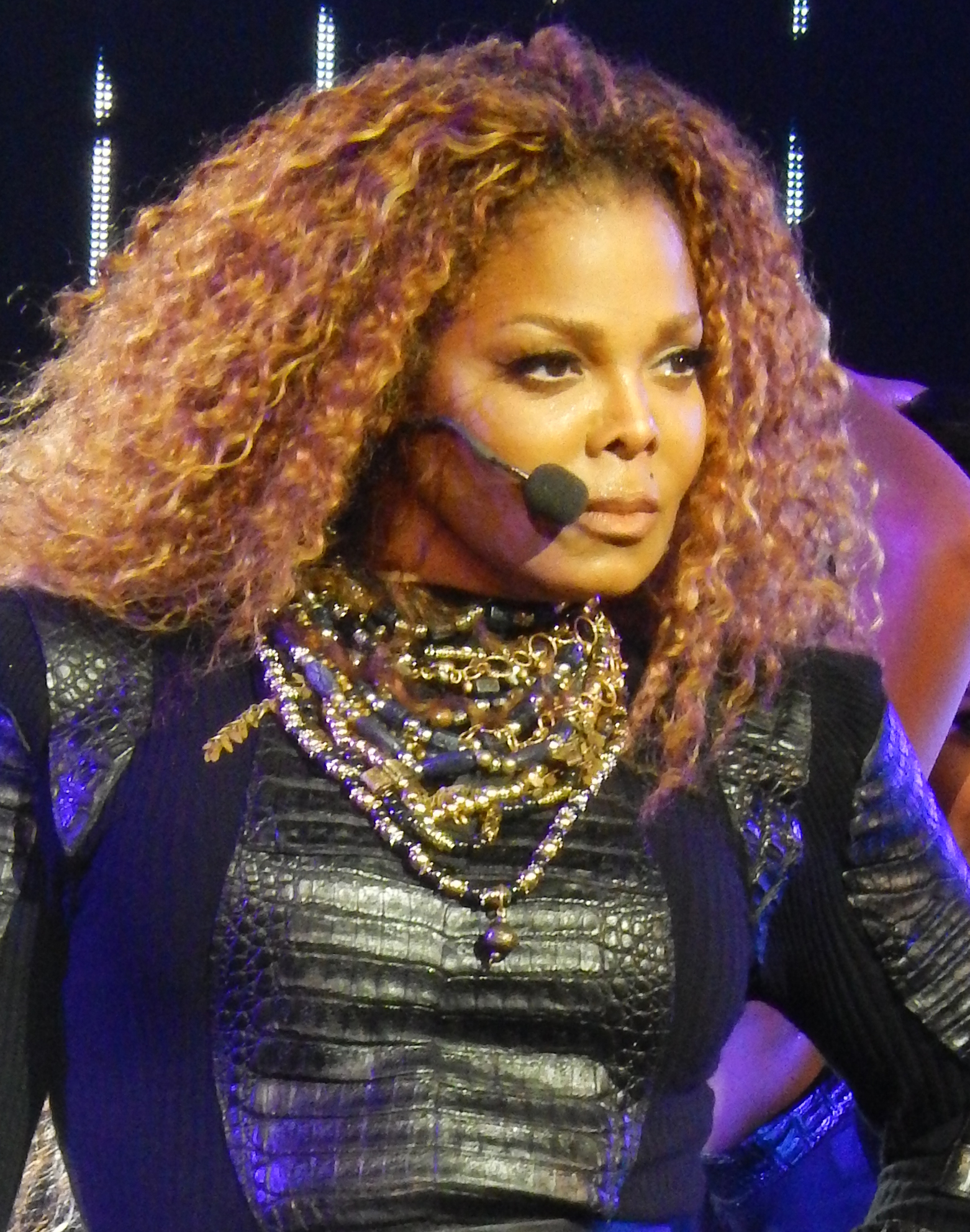
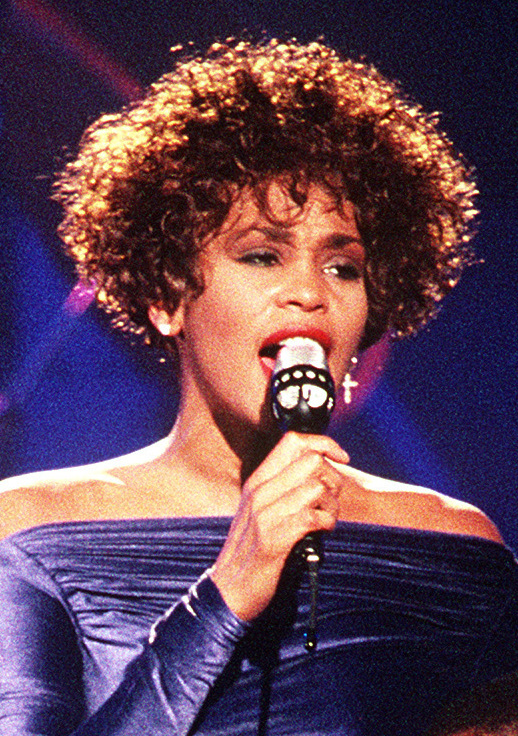
Spears credits artists such as (left to right) Madonna, Janet Jackson, and Whitney Houston as major musical influences.

Spears has cited Madonna, Janet Jackson, and Whitney Houston as major influences, her "three favorite artists" as a child, whom she would "sing along to ... day and night in [her] living room"; Houston's "I Have Nothing" was the song she auditioned to that landed her record deal with Jive Records. Spears also named Mariah Carey as "one of the main reasons I started singing". Throughout her career, Spears has drawn frequent comparisons to Madonna and Jackson in particular, in terms of vocals, choreography, and stage presence. According to Spears: "I know when I was younger, I looked up to people ... like, you know, Janet Jackson and Madonna. And they were major inspirations for me. But I also had my own identity and I knew who I was."

In the 2002 book Madonnastyle by Carol Clerk, Spears is quoted saying: "I have been a huge fan of Madonna since I was a little girl. She's the person that I've really looked up to. I would really, really like to be a legend like Madonna." Spears cited "That's the Way Love Goes" as the inspiration for her song "Touch of My Hand" from her album In the Zone, saying "I like to compare it to 'That's the Way Love Goes,' kind of a Janet Jackson thing." She also said her song "Just Luv Me" from her Glory album also reminded her of "That's the Way Love Goes".

After personally meeting Spears, Jackson stated: "she said to me, 'I'm such a big fan; I really admire you.' That's so flattering. Everyone gets inspiration from some place. And it's awesome to see someone else coming up who's dancing and singing, and seeing how all these kids relate to her. A lot of people put it down, but what she does is a positive thing." Madonna said of Spears in the documentary Britney: For the Record: "I admire her talent as an artist ... There are aspects about her that I recognize in myself when I first started out in my career." Spears has also named Michael Jackson, Mariah Carey, Sheryl Crow, Otis Redding, Shania Twain, Brandy, Beyoncé, Natalie Imbruglia, Cher, and Prince as inspirations, and younger artists such as Selena Gomez and Ariana Grande.

=== Musical style ===
Spears is described as a pop artist and generally explores the genre in the form of dance-pop. Following her debut, she was credited with influencing the revival of teen pop in the late 1990s. Rob Sheffield of Rolling Stone wrote: "Spears carries on the classic archetype of the rock & roll teen queen, the dungaree doll, the angel baby who just has to make a scene." In a review of ...Baby One More Time, Stephen Thomas Erlewine of AllMusic described her music as a "blend of infectious, rap-inflected dance-pop and smooth balladry". Oops!... I Did It Again saw Spears working with several R&B producers to create "a combination of bubblegum, urban soul, and raga". Her third studio album, Britney, derived from the teen pop niche "[r]hythmically and melodically", but was described as "sharper, tougher than what came before", incorporating genres such as R&B, disco, and funk.

Spears has explored and heavily incorporated the genres of electropop and dance music in her records, as well as influences of urban and hip-hop, which are most present on In the Zone and Blackout. In the Zone also experiments with Euro trance, reggae, and Middle Eastern music. Femme Fatale and Britney Jean were also heavily influenced by electronic music genres. Spears's ninth studio album, Glory, is more eclectic and experimental than her previously released work. She commented that it "took a lot of time ... it's really different ... there are like two or three songs that go in the direction of more urban that I've wanted to do for a long time now, and I just haven't really done that."

...Baby One More Time and Oops!... I Did It Again address themes such as love and relationships from a teenager's point of view. Following the massive commercial success of her first two studio albums, Spears's team and producers wanted to maintain the formula that took her to the top of the charts. Spears, however, was no longer satisfied with the sound and themes covered on her records. She co-wrote five songs and chose each track's producer on her third studio album, Britney, whose lyrics address the subjects of reaching adulthood, sexuality, and self-discovery. Sex, dancing, freedom, and love continued to be Spears's main subjects on her subsequent albums. Her fifth studio effort, Blackout, also addresses issues such as fame and media scrutiny, including on the song "Piece of Me".

Spears's music has also been noted for some catchphrases. The opening in her debut single "...Baby One More Time", "Oh, baby baby" is considered to be one of her signature lines and has been parodied in the media by various artists such as Nicole Scherzinger and Ariana Grande. It has been used in various forms throughout her music, such as simply, "baby" and "oh baby", as well as the Blackout track, "Ooh Ooh Baby". On the initial development of "...Baby One More Time", Barry Weiss noted Spears's inception of the catchphrase from her strange ad-libbing during the recording of the song. He commented further, "We thought it was really weird at first. It was strange. It was not the way Max wrote it. But it worked! We thought it could be a really good opening salvo for her." The opening line in "Gimme More", "It's Britney, bitch" has become another signature phrase. An early review of Blackout suggested the phrase was "simply laughable". Amy Roberts of Bustle called it "an indelible cultural turning point, transforming a frenetic, floundering moment in the superstar's career to one of strength and empowerment".

=== Voice ===
"You Got It All"
The cover of the Jets's song was Spears's first recording for her then-label Jive in 1997. The prominent use of melisma and vibrato as she continuously raises key into a high range was viewed as a Mariah Carey influence.

"Freakshow"
The track is built around the 'wobbler' effect of dubstep, and her vocals are pitched down low, making her sound masculine. She has been credited as one of the artists who prompted the genre within a pop mainstream audience.

Spears is a soprano. (Note: Other sources state that she possesses a contralto vocal range.) Before her breakthrough success, she is described as having sung "much deeper than her highly recognizable trademark voice of today", with Eric Foster White, who worked with Spears on her debut album, ...Baby One More Time, was said to have shaped her vocals "over the course of a month" upon being signed to Jive Records "to where it is today—distinctively, unmistakably Britney". Rami Yacoub, who co-produced Spears's debut album with lyricist Max Martin, commented, "I know from Denniz Pop and Max's previous productions, when we do songs, there's kind of a nasal thing. With N' Sync and the Backstreet Boys, we had to push for that mid-nasal voice. When Britney did that, she got this kind of raspy, sexy voice."

Guy Blackman of The Age wrote that "[t]he thing about Spears, though, is that her biggest songs, no matter how committee-created or impossibly polished, have always been convincing because of her delivery, her commitment and her presence. ... Spears expresses perfectly the conflicting urges of adolescence, the tension between chastity and sexual experience, between hedonism and responsibility, between confidence and vulnerability." Producer William Orbit, who worked with Spears on her album Britney Jean, stated regarding her vocals: "[Britney] didn't get so big just because [she] put on great shows; [she] got to be that way because [her voice is] unique: you hear two words and you know who is singing."

Spears has also been criticized for her reliance on Auto-Tune and her vocals being "over-processed" on records. Erlewine criticized Spears's singing abilities in a review of her Blackout album, stating: "Never the greatest vocalist, her thin squawk could be dismissed early in her career as an adolescent learning the ropes, but nearly a decade later her singing hasn't gotten any better, even if the studio tools to masquerade her weaknesses have." Joan Anderman of The Boston Globe remarked that "Spears sounds robotic, nearly inhuman, on her records, so processed is her voice by digital pitch-shifters and synthesizers."

Kayla Upadhyaya of The Michigan Daily has provided a different point of view, stating: "Auto-tuned and over-processed vocals define [Spears]'s voice as an artist, and in her music, auto-tune isn't so much a gimmick as it is an instrument used to highlight, contort and make a statement." Adam Markovitz of Entertainment Weekly opines that "Spears is no technical singer, that's for sure. But backed by Martin and Dr. Luke's wall of sound, her vocals melt into a mix of babytalk coo and coital panting that is, in its own overprocessed way, just as iconic and propulsive as Michael Jackson's yips or Eminem's snarls."

=== Stage performances and videos ===
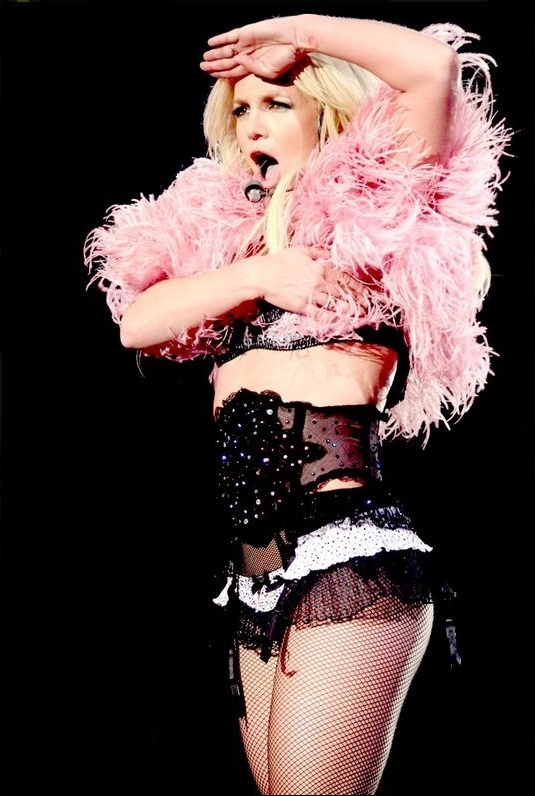
Spears performing on The Circus Starring Britney Spears tour in 2009

Spears is known for her stage performances, particularly the elaborate dance routines which incorporate "belly-dancing and tempered erotic moves" that are credited with influencing "dance-heavy acts" such as Danity Kane and the Pussycat Dolls. In 2011, Rolling Stone readers voted Spears their second-favorite dancing musician, after Michael Jackson. Spears is described as being much more shy than her stage persona suggests. She said that performing is "a boost to [her] confidence. It's like an alter-ego type thing. Something clicks and I go and turn into this different person. I think it's kind of a gift to be able to do that." Her 2000, 2001, and 2003 MTV Video Music Awards performances were lauded, while her 2007 presentation was widely panned by critics, as she "teetered through her dance steps and mouthed only occasional words". Billboard called her 2016 "comeback" performance at the show "an effective, but not entirely glorious, bid to regain pop superstardom".

After her knee injuries and personal problems, Spears's "showmanship" and dance abilities came under criticism. Serge F. Kovaleski of The New York Times watched her Las Vegas concert residency in 2016 and stated: "Once a fluid, natural dancer, Ms. Spears can appear stiff, even robotic, today, relying on flailing arms and flashy sets." Las Vegas Sun's Robin Leach seemed more impressed over Spears's efforts, saying that she delivered a "flawless performance" on the residency's opening night.

It has been widely reported that Spears lip-syncs during live performances, which often prompts criticism from music critics and concert goers. Some, however, claimed that, although she "got plenty of digital support", she "doesn't merely lip-sync" during her live shows. In 2016, Sabrina Weiss of Refinery29 referred to her lip-syncing as a "well-known fact that's not even taboo anymore." Noting on the prevalence of lip-syncing, the Los Angeles Daily News opined: "In the context of a Britney Spears concert, does it really matter? ... you [just] go for the somewhat-ridiculous spectacle of it all". Spears herself has commented on the topic, arguing: "Because I'm dancing so much, I do have a little bit of playback, but there's a mixture of my voice and the playback. ... It really pisses me off because I'm busting my ass out there and singing at the same time and nobody ever gives me credit for it".

In 2012, VH1 ranked Spears fourth among the 50 Greatest Women of the Video Era, while Billboard ranked her eighth among Greatest Music Video Artists of All Time in 2020, explaining: "The storylines, the dancing, the outfits. Right from the start, the pop princess established the lengths of her creativity with some of the most memorable videos of the last three decades." She has been retroactively noted as a pioneer for her early career videography. She conceptualized the "iconic Catholic schoolgirl and cheerleader motif" in the "...Baby One More Time" video, rejecting the animation video idea. She also made the "Oops!... I Did It Again" video "dance-centric rather than space-centric as her producers suggested". She also used her dancer's intuition to help select the beats for each track.

== Public image ==
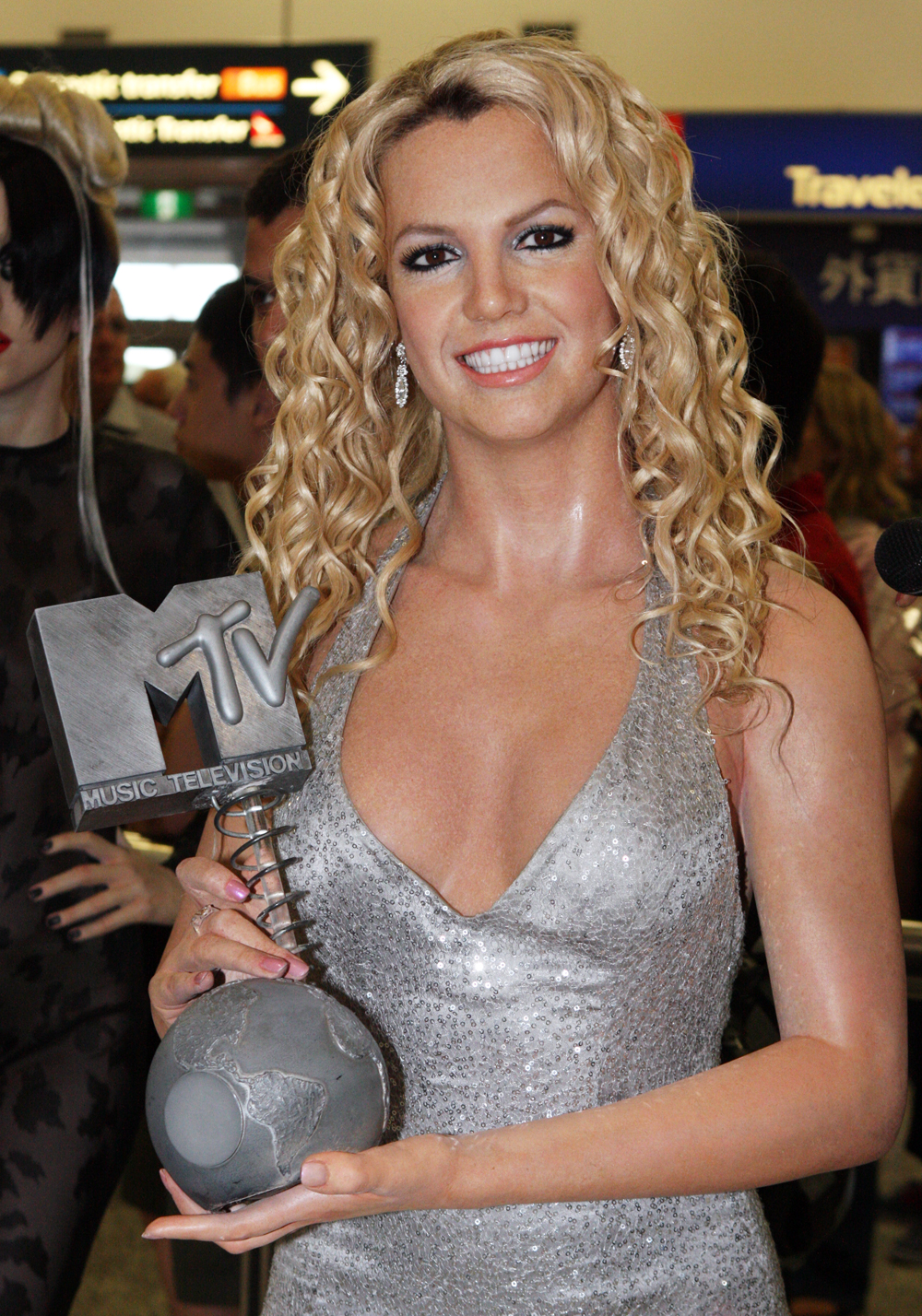
Wax figure of Spears on display at Madame Tussauds in London

Upon launching her music career with ...Baby One More Time, Spears was labeled a teen idol, and Rolling Stone described her as "the latest model of a classic product: the unneurotic pop star who performs her duties with vaudevillian pluck and spokesmodel charm." The April 1999 cover of Rolling Stone pictured a 17-year-old Spears reclining on a bed, wearing an exposed bra and hot pants while cradling a Teletubby in one arm. The American Family Association (AFA) decried the image as "a disturbing mix of childhood innocence and adult sexuality" and called on "God-loving Americans to boycott stores selling Britney's albums". Spears addressed the outcry, commenting: "What's the big deal? I have strong morals. ... I'd do it again. I thought the pictures were fine. And I was tired of being compared to Debbie Gibson and all of this bubblegum pop all the time." Shortly before this, Spears had announced publicly she would remain abstinent until marriage.

An early criticism of Spears dismissed her as "the product of a Swedish songwriting factory that had no real hand in either her music or her persona". Vox editor Constance Grady wrote this was perpetuated from the fact that Spears debuted in the late 1990s, when music was dominated by rockism, that prizes "so-called authenticity and grittiness of rock above all else". Spears's "slick, breezy pop was an affront to rockist sensibilities, and claiming that Spears was fake was an easy way to dismiss her." Ron Levy for Rolling Stone noted that "I have to tell you, if the record company could have created more than one Britney Spears, they would have done it, and they tried!"

Billboard opined that, by the time Spears released her second album, Oops!... I Did It Again, "There was a shift occurring in both the music and her public image: She was sharper, sexier and singing about more grown-up fare, setting the stage for 2001's Britney, which shed her innocent skin and ushered her into adulthood." Britney's lead single, "I'm a Slave 4 U", and its music video were also credited for distancing her from her previous "wholesome bubblegum star" image. Stephen Thomas Erlewine of AllMusic remarked, "If 2001's Britney was a transitional album, capturing Spears at the point when she wasn't a girl and not yet a woman, its 2003 follow-up, In the Zone, is where she has finally completed that journey and turned into Britney, the Adult Woman." Erlewine likened Spears to fellow singer Christina Aguilera, explaining that both equated "maturity with transparent sexuality and the pounding sounds of nightclubs". Brittany Spanos of LA Weekly stated that Spears "set the bar for the 'adulthood' transition teen pop stars often struggle with".

Spears's erratic behavior and personal problems during 2006–08 were highly publicized and affected both her career and public image. Erlewine writes that "each new disaster [was] stripping away any residual sexiness in her public image". In a 2008 article, Rolling Stone's Vanessa Grigoriadis described her much-publicized personal issues as "the most public downfall of any star in history". Spears later received favorable media attention; Billboard wrote that her appearance at the 2008 MTV Video Music Awards "was a picture of professionalism and poise" after her "disastrous" performance the previous year, while Business Insider ran an article on how she had "lost control of her life ... and then made an incredible career comeback". In 2017, Spears said: "I think I had to give myself more breaks through my career and take responsibility for my mental health. ... I wrote back then, that I was lost and didn't know what to do with myself. I was trying to please everyone around me because that's who I am deep inside. There are moments where I look back and think: 'What the hell was I thinking?'"

In September 2002, Spears was placed at number eight on VH1's 100 Sexiest Artists list. She was placed at number one on FHM's 100 Sexiest Women in the World list in 2004, and, in December 2012, Complex ranked her 12th on its 100 Hottest Female Singers of All Time list. Remarking upon her perceived image as a sex symbol, Spears stated: "When I'm on stage, that's my time to do my thing and go there and be that — and it's fun. It's exhilarating just to be something that you're not. And people tend to believe it." In 2003, People cited her as one of the 50 Most Beautiful People.

In interviews, Spears has described aspects of her personality that contrast with her public image. Reflecting on her youth, she said she was "a pretty normal girl, a tomboy." She has also stated that she is "really just a tomboy at heart," noting her preference for casual clothing such as jeans and sweatpants. In reference to her personal relationships, she has said, "I've always been a tomboy, I've always ended up being the man in the relationship."

Spears is recognized as a gay icon and received the 2018 GLAAD Vanguard Award at the GLAAD Media Awards for her role in "accelerating acceptance for the LGBTQ community". She addressed the "unwavering loyalty" and "lack of judgment" of her LGBTQ fans in Billboard's Love Letters to the LGBTQ Community. She said: "Your stories are what inspire me, bring me joy, and make me and my sons strive to be better people." Manuel Betancourt of Vice wrote about the "queer adoration", especially of gay men, for Spears, and said that "Where other gay icons exude self-possession, Spears's fragile resilience has made her an even more fascinating role model, closer to Judy Garland than to Lady Gaga ... she's a glittering mirror ball, a fractured reflection of those men on the dance floor back onto themselves." HuffPost's Ben Appel attributed Spears's status as a gay icon to her "oh-so-innocent/not that innocent" Monroe-like sensuality, her sweet, almost saccharine nature, her beyond basic but addictive pop songs, her dance moves, her phoenix-out-of-the-fire comeback from a series of mental health crises, and her unmistakable tenderness. "Britney is camp. She is a fashion plate. A doll. Britney is a drag queen."

Since her first public appearances, Spears has been a tabloid fixture and a paparazzi target. According to Vanity Fair, photos of Spears sold for a combined value of $100 million in 2007. Steve Huey of AllMusic remarked that "among female singers of [Spears's] era ... her celebrity star power was rivaled only by Jennifer Lopez." "Britney Spears" was Yahoo!'s most popular search term between 2005 and 2008, and has been in a total of seven different years. Spears was named as Most Searched Person in the Guinness World Records book edition 2007 and 2009. She was later named as the most searched person of the decade 2000–2009.

As a public figure, Spears "has never been known to her fans as a politically active, committed—or even aware—entertainer." In a 2003 interview with Tucker Carlson, she commented on President George W. Bush and the Iraq War, saying that "we should just trust our president in every decision that he makes ... and be faithful in what happens". Michael Moore included the footage of Spears's answer in his "anti-Bush" documentary Fahrenheit 9/11, which, according to The Washington Times's James Frazier, presented her "as an example of a naive American blindly trusting a dishonest commander in chief" and fueled the "urban legend" of a "conservative" Spears. Frazier also said that "the few positions she has taken can hardly be considered conservative", such as supporting same-sex marriage. In 2016, Spears posted pictures of a meeting with Hillary Clinton on social media. She described Clinton as "an inspiration and [a] beautiful voice for women around the world".

In December 2017, Spears publicly supported the DREAM Act in the wake of the announcement that Donald Trump would end the DACA policy, which previously granted undocumented immigrants who came to the country as minors a renewable two-year period of deferred action from deportation. She posted a photo of herself on social media wearing a black T-shirt that reads "We Are All Dreamers" in white letters. The caption read, "Tell Congress to pass the #DreamAct".

On September 15, 2021, Spears was named one of the 100 most influential people of the year by Time. A few days before the editors' list was released, Spears was put at the top of the readers' voting list of which personalities should be included on the annual Time 100 list. Deemed an icon of that year, editors highlighted the impact of her fight against her conservatorship as well as of the #FreeBritney movement. In October 2021, Spears thanked her fans and the #FreeBritney movement for "freeing me from my conservatorship". Spears was also named most famous celebrity from Louisiana, in a 2024 study of internet searches by LouisianaBets.com.

== Legacy ==
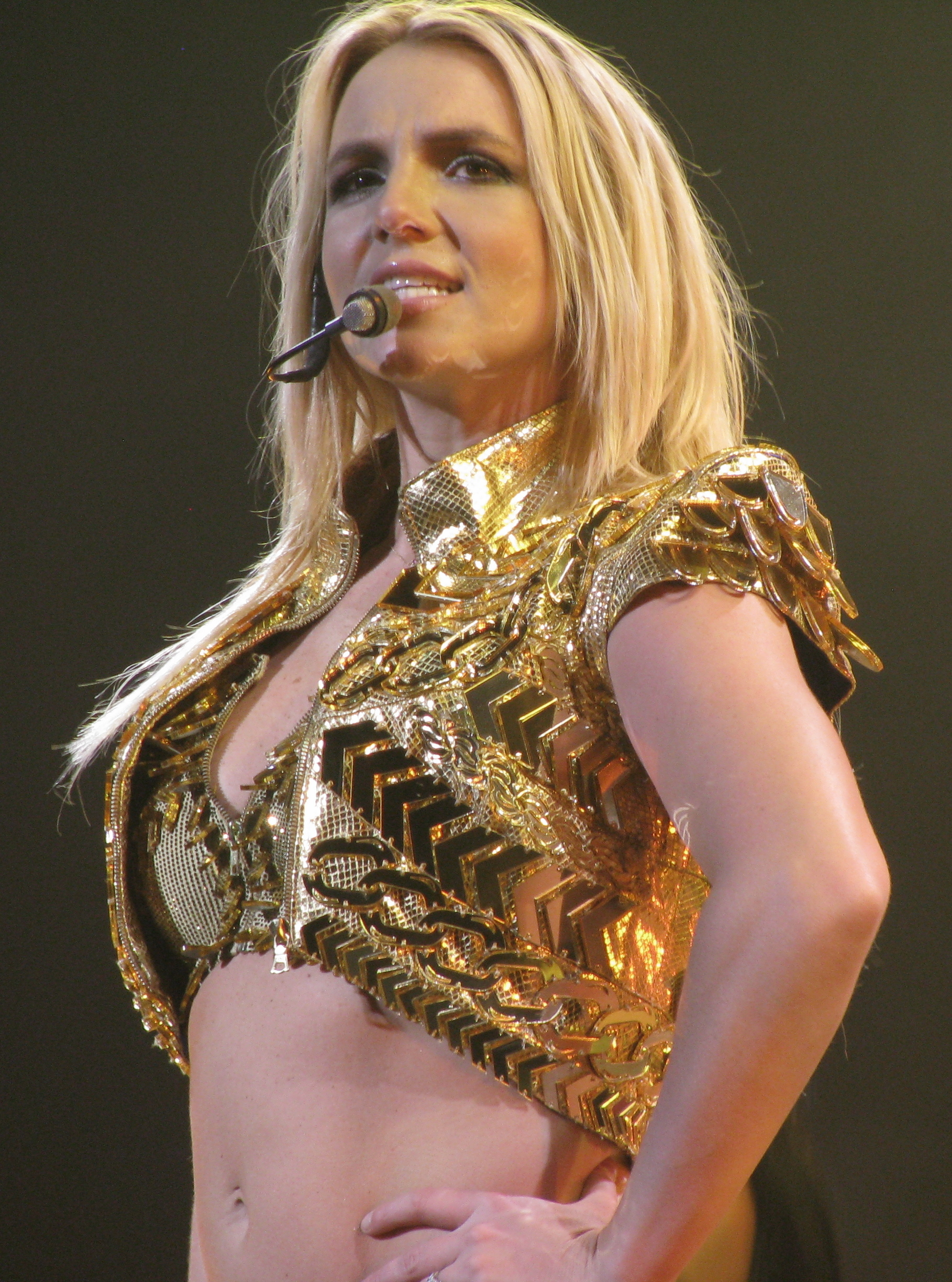
Spears in 2011

Referred to as the "Princess of Pop", Spears was credited as one of the "driving force[s] behind the return of teen pop in the late 1990s". Rolling Stone's Stacy Lambe explained that she "help[ed] to usher in a new era for the genre that had gone dormant in the decade that followed New Kids on the Block. ... Spears would lead an army of pop stars ... built on slick Max Martin productions, plenty of sexual innuendo and dance-heavy performances. [She became] one of the most successful artists of all time—and a cautionary tale for a generation, whether they paid attention or not." In a 2021 article for Time, Maura Johnston opined that "Spears's legacy as a pop artist is complex, made up of dazzling musical heights and music-business-borne lows". Johnston also commented: "While Spears's catalog is part of the canon that defines the first 20 years of this millennium, one hopes that her public struggles, and the strength she's shown while enduring them, will lead to her cementing her true legacy: Reshaping the machine that turns those songs into cultural touchstones."

Glamour contributor Christopher Rosa described her as "one of pop music's defining voices. ... When she emerged onto the scene in 1998 with ...Baby One More Time, the world hadn't seen a performer like her. Not since Madonna had a female artist affected the genre so profoundly." Billboard's Robert Kelly observed that Spears's "sexy and coy" vocals on her debut single "...Baby One More Time" "kicked off a new era of pop vocal stylings that would influence countless artists to come". In 2020, Rolling Stone ranked the song at number one on a list of the 100 Greatest Debut Singles of All Time and Rob Sheffield described it as "One of those pop manifestos that announces a new sound, a new era, a new century. But most of all, a new star ... With "...Baby One More Time", [Spears] changed the sound of pop forever: It's Britney, bitch. Nothing was ever the same."

Spears was at the forefront of the female teen pop explosion starting in 1999 and extending through the 2000s, leading the pack of Christina Aguilera, Jessica Simpson, and Mandy Moore. All of these performers had been developing material in 1998, but the market changed dramatically in December 1998 when Spears's single and video were charting highly. RCA Records quickly signed Aguilera and released her debut single to capitalize on Spears's success, producing her debut hit single "Genie in a Bottle". Simpson consciously modeled her persona as more mature than Spears; her "I Wanna Love You Forever" charted in September 1999, and her album Sweet Kisses followed shortly after. Moore's first single, "Candy", hit the airwaves a month before Simpson's single. Fueling media stories about their competition for first place, Spears and Aguilera traded barbs but also compliments through the 2000s.

Alim Kheraj of Dazed called Spears "one of pop's most important pioneers". After eighteen years as a performer, Billboard described her as having "earned her title as one of pop's reigning queens. Since her early days as a Mouseketeer, [Spears] has pushed the boundaries of 21st century sounds, paving the way for a generation of artists to shamelessly embrace glossy pop and redefine how one can accrue consistent success in the music industry." Entertainment Weekly's Adam Markovitz described Spears as "an American institution, as deeply sacred and messed up as pro wrestling or the filibuster." She was ranked at number six on Billboard's 2024 Greatest Pop Stars of the 21st Century list and number 14 on its 2025 "Top 100 Women Artists of the 21st Century" list.

Spears has been credited with redefining Las Vegas residencies as a retirement place for musicians. Her debut concert residency Britney: Piece of Me was described as "the natural evolution of Celine Dion's powerhourse Vegas residency, a still-charting star of another generation redefining the role of Strip headliner." Forbes named Spears the sixth-highest-earning female musician of 2015. She is credited with influencing and paving the way for other artists's residencies such as Jennifer Lopez's Jennifer Lopez: All I Have, Bruno Mars's Bruno Mars at Park MGM, and Backstreet Boys' Backstreet Boys: Larger Than Life. The arrival of Spears "saw the pop promoters finally tap into the younger crowd arriving in town for a good time".

Spears's much-publicized personal problems and her subsequent career comeback have inspired some artists. Gwyneth Paltrow's character in the 2010 film Country Strong was inspired by Spears's treatment by the media. According to film director Shana Fest, "that's where this movie came from. I mean, I was seeing what was happening in the media to Britney Spears. I think it's tragic how we treat people who give us so much, and we love to see them knocked down to build them back up again, to knock them down again." Nicki Minaj has cited Spears's comeback after her much-publicized personal issues as an inspiration. Spears's hounding by paparazzi and personal problems also inspired Barry Manilow's album 15 Minutes. Manilow said: "She couldn't have a life without them pulling up next to her car and following her and driving her crazy to the point where, that was around the time she shaved off her hair. ... We all looked at it in horror ... So it seemed like a thing to be writing an album about." Bebo Norman wrote a song about Spears, called "Britney", which was inspired by "culture's make-or-break treatment of celebrities". Along with Alicia Silverstone, Christy Turlington, and Naomi Campbell, Spears has been credited with introducing the navel piercing to mainstream culture.

== Achievements ==
Spears's awards and accolades include a Grammy Award; 15 Guinness World Records; six MTV Video Music Awards, including the Michael Jackson Video Vanguard Award; seven Billboard Music Awards, including the Millennium Award; the inaugural Radio Disney Icon Award; the GLAAD Media Award's Vanguard Award; and a star on the Hollywood Walk of Fame.

Spears is listed by the Guinness World Records as having the "Best-selling album by a teenage solo artist" for her debut studio album, ...Baby One More Time, which sold over 13 million copies in the United States. Melissa Ruggieri of the Richmond Times-Dispatch reported: "She's also marked for being the best-selling teenage artist. Before she turned 20 in 2001, Spears had sold over 37 million albums worldwide".

Spears has sold over 150 million records worldwide, making her one of the best-selling music artists of all time. She also sold more than 70 million records in United States, including 36.9 million digital singles and 33.6 million digital albums. Spears is further recognized as the best-selling female albums artist of the 2000s in the United States, as well as the fifth overall. In December 2009, Billboard ranked Spears the 8th Artist of the 2000s decade in the United States. She is one of the few artists in history to have had a number-one single and a number-one studio album in the US during each of the three decades of her career. With "3" in 2009 and "Hold It Against Me" in 2011, she became the second artist after Mariah Carey in the Hot 100's history to debut at number one with two or more songs. In 2016, Spears ranked at number twenty on Billboard's Greatest Of All Time Top Dance Club Artists list.

== Other ventures ==
=== Product and endorsements ===
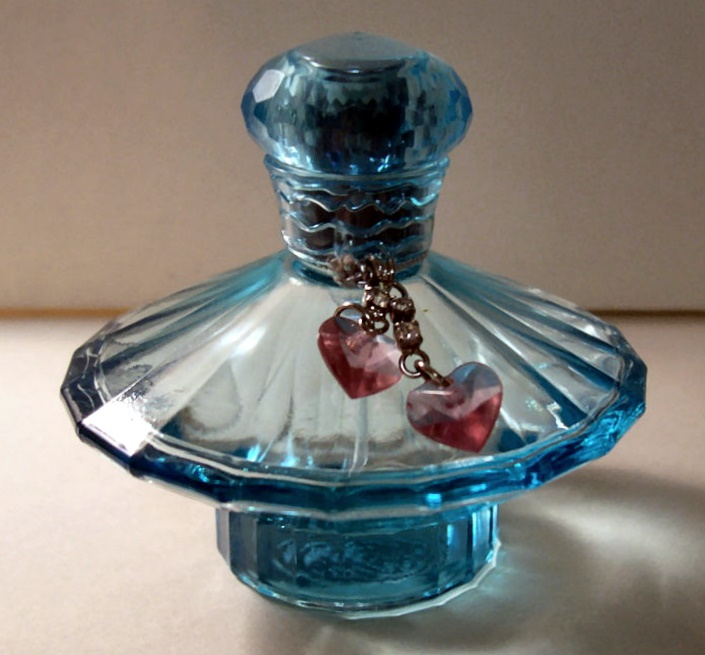
Bottle of one of Spears's several perfumes, Curious, released through Elizabeth Arden, Inc.

In 2000, Spears released a limited edition of sunglasses titled Shades of Britney. In 2001, she signed a deal with shoe company Skechers, and a $7–8 million promotional deal with Pepsi, their biggest entertainment deal at the time. Aside from numerous commercials with the latter during that year, she also appeared in a 2004 Pepsi television commercial in the theme of "Gladiators" with singers Beyoncé, Pink, and Enrique Iglesias. On June 19, 2002, she released her first multi-platform video game, Britney's Dance Beat, which received positive reviews.

In March 2009, Spears was announced time as the new face of clothing brand Candie's. Dari Marder, chief marketing officer for the brand, said: "Everybody loves a comeback and nobody's doing it better than Britney. She's just poised for even greater success." In 2010, Spears designed a limited edition line for the brand, which was released in stores in July 2010. In 2011, she teamed up with Sony, Make Up For Ever, and Plenty of Fish to release her music video for "Hold It Against Me", earning her $500,000 for the product placement.

Spears teamed up with Hasbro in 2012 to release an exclusive version of Twister Dance, which includes a remix of "Till the World Ends". She was featured on a commercial, which was directed by Ray Kay, to promote the game. Spears was also featured on the commercial of Twister Dance Rave, and the game included a Twister remix of "Circus". In March 2018, it was revealed that Spears would be the face of Kenzo, a contemporary French luxury clothing house.

Spears's range of commercial deals and products also includes beauty care products and perfumes. She released her first perfume with Elizabeth Arden, Curious, in 2004, which broke the company's first-week gross for a perfume. By 2009, she had released seven more perfumes, including Fantasy. In 2010, Spears released her eighth fragrance, Radiance.

In 2011, Radiance was reissued as a new perfume titled Cosmic Radiance. Worldwide, Spears sold over one million bottles in the first five years, with gross receipts of $1.5 billion. In 2016, Spears contacted Glu Mobile to create her own role-playing game, Britney Spears: American Dream. The app officially launched in May 2016 and is compatible with iOS and Android. On June 17, 2016, Spears announced the release of her twentieth fragrance, Private Show. As of January 2018, Spears has released 24 fragrances through Elizabeth Arden.

=== Philanthropy ===
Spears founded The Britney Spears Foundation, a charitable entity set up to help children in need. The philosophy behind the Foundation was that music and entertainment has a healing quality that can benefit children. The Foundation also supported the annual Britney Spears Camp for the Performing Arts, where campers had the opportunity to explore and develop their talents. In April 2002, through the efforts of Spears and The Britney Spears Foundation, a grant of $1 million was made to the Twin Towers Fund to support the children of uniformed service heroes affected by the terrorist attacks of September 11, 2001, including New York City Fire Department and its Emergency Medical Services Command, the New York City Police Department, the Port Authority of New York and New Jersey, the New York State Office of court Administration and other government offices. However, it was reported in 2008 that the Foundation had a deficit of $200,000. After Spears went through conservatorship, her father and lawyer Andrew Wallet zeroed out the effort, leading to its closure in 2011.

On October 30, 2001, Spears, alongside Bono and other popular recording artists under the name "Artists Against AIDS Worldwide", released an album consisting of multiple versions of Marvin Gaye's "What's Going On", intending to benefit AIDS programs in Africa and other impoverished regions. In 2005, Spears donated $350,000 to Music Rising for Hurricane Katrina victims. Spears has also helped several charities during her career, including Madonna's Kabbalah-based Spirituality for Kids, cancer charity Gilda's Club Worldwide, the Promises Foundation, and the United Way, with the latter two focused on giving families from various disadvantaged situations new hope and stable foundations for the future.

On October 24, 2015, Spears donated $120,000 to the Nevada Childhood Cancer Foundation (NCCF). In addition, $1 of each ticket sale from her Las Vegas residency, Britney: Piece of Me, was donated to the foundation. Spears fundraised for the charity through social media and sold limited edition merchandise, with all proceeds going to the NCCF. On October 27, 2016, Spears partnered with Zappos and XCYCLE to host the Britney Spears Piece of Me Charity Ride in Boca Park, Las Vegas to raise additional money toward her goal of $1 million for the NCCF, with $450,000 having already been raised from her ticket sales and merchandise. Participants were entered for a chance to win a spin class with Spears herself. The event ultimately went on to raise $553,130. The fundraising ultimately led to the development of the NCCF Britney Spears Campus in Las Vegas, which saw its grand opening on November 4, 2017. Spears also regularly participates in Spirit Day to combat bullying, in particular bullying of LGBTQ youth.

In March 2020, Spears was participating in the #DoYourPartChallenge, which entails helping people with anything they might need during the COVID-19 pandemic. She told fans to send her messages on Instagram if they needed supportive words during the coronavirus pandemic, with Spears picking three fans. In February 2024, Spears partnered with New York City dessert shop Glace, to create the "Britney Brûlée" dessert, with a portion of the proceeds from its sales being donated to The Trevor Project.

== Discography ==
- ...Baby One More Time (1999)
- Oops!... I Did It Again (2000)
- Britney (2001)
- In the Zone (2003)
- Blackout (2007)
- Circus (2008)
- Femme Fatale (2011)
- Britney Jean (2013)
- Glory (2016)

== Filmography ==
- Longshot (2001)
- Crossroads (2002)
- Austin Powers in Goldmember (2002)
- Pauly Shore Is Dead (2003)
- Fahrenheit 9/11 (2004)
- Corporate Animals (2019)

== Concerts and residencies ==
=== Tours ===
- ...Baby One More Time Tour (1999)
- (You Drive Me) Crazy Tour (2000)
- Oops!... I Did It Again Tour (2000–2001)
- Dream Within a Dream Tour (2001–2002)
- The Onyx Hotel Tour (2004)
- The M+M's Tour (2007)
- The Circus Starring Britney Spears (2009)
- Femme Fatale Tour (2011)
- Britney: Live in Concert (2017)
- Piece of Me Tour (2018)

=== Residencies ===
- Britney: Piece of Me (2013–2017)

== See also ==
- Artists with the most number-one European singles
- Forbes Celebrity 100
- List of atheists in film, radio, television and theater
- List of artists who reached number one in the United States
- List of best-selling singles
- List of Billboard Hot 100 chart achievements and milestones
- List of dancers
- List of highest-certified music artists in the United States
- List of most expensive music videos
- List of most-followed Twitter accounts
- Time 100
