= Elizabeth Arden, Inc. =

American cosmetics company

- Type: Subsidiary
- Traded as: Nasdaq: RDEN
- Founded: 1910; 116 years ago (as Red Door)
- Founder: Elizabeth Arden
- Headquarters: Miramar, Florida, U.S.
- Key people: Michelle Peluso (CEO)
- Products: Cosmetics, skin care, and fragrances
- Revenue: US$966.7 million (2016)
- Operating income: −US$40.9 million (2016)
- Net income: −US$73.5 million (2016)
- Number of employees: ~1,900 Full-time; ~500 Part-time (2016)
- Parent: Revlon, Inc.
- Website: elizabetharden.com

Elizabeth Arden, Inc. is a major American cosmetics, skin care, and fragrance company founded by Elizabeth Arden. As of September 7, 2016, the company is a wholly owned subsidiary of Revlon, Inc.

The company is located in Pembroke Pines, Florida, a suburb of Miami.

== History ==
The company was founded as Red Door salon on Fifth Avenue in 1910. Arden's company was then sold to Eli Lilly and Company in 1971 for $38 million ($302,095,316 today). Eli Lilly and Company sold Arden to Fabergé in 1987 for $657 million.

Arden's cosmetics company was bought from Unilever in 2003 by FFI for $225 million, a New York company. They changed the company's name to Elizabeth Arden, which was publicly listed (Nasdaq: RDEN).

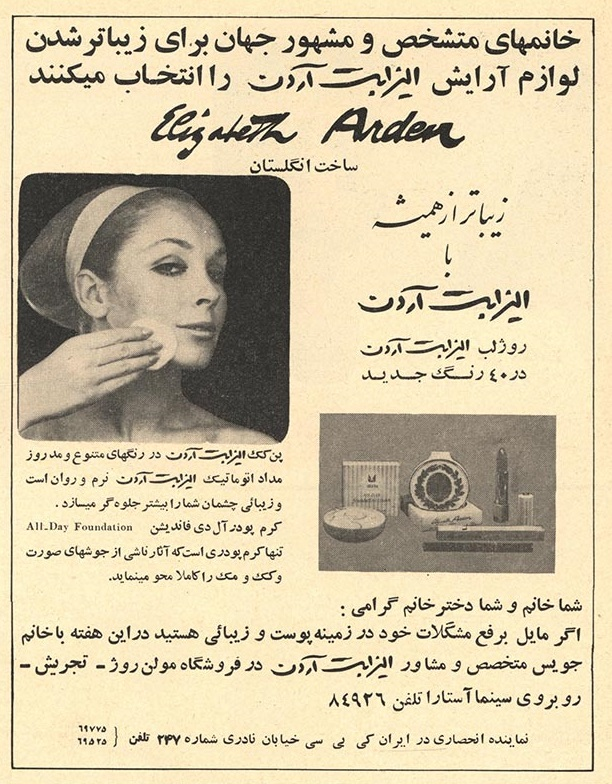
A 1968 magazine ad of Elizabeth Arden in Persian, in Zan-e Rooz

Past 'faces' of Elizabeth Arden were Vendela Kirsebom during the 1980s, Amber Valletta to the mid-1990s, and Catherine Zeta-Jones. On December 2, 2014, the company announced Karlina Caune would be the new face of the brand.

Peter W. England served as president and chief executive officer for five years, before resigning in January 2000. E. Scott Beattie served as the company's CEO from March 2000 until Debra Perelman took over on May 23, 2018. Perelman stepped down in 2023.

Since Arden's death, some of the company's focus has shifted to developing several fragrance lines. The company's first fragrance, Blue Grass (fragrance), was released in 1934 and was the first American perfume to find international success. Their next signature fragrance is called "Red Door," named after their day spas, which are called "Elizabeth Arden Red Door Salons". Other fragrances within their own line are "Fifth Avenue" (created by Ann Gottlieb), "Green Tea", "Provocative Woman", "Mediterranean", "Pretty", "Red Door Aura", and "Untold". In 2026, they launched a new fragrance, "Eternal Aura". Leighton Meester was named as the face of the new fragrance. The company holds the license to Britney Spears fragrances, as well as the Hilary Duff, Elizabeth Taylor, and Mariah Carey fragrance collections. Juicy Couture's "Viva la Juicy", "Couture Couture", and "Peace, Love & Juicy Couture", Justin Bieber, Taylor Swift, and Christina Aguilera's fragrance collections are recent additions to the Arden portfolio.

== Sale to Revlon ==
In June 2016, US cosmetics company Revlon announced its intention to buy Elizabeth Arden Inc. for US$870 million (£611m).

On September 7, 2016, Revlon completed its acquisition of Elizabeth Arden.

On November 3, 2016, Revlon's board of directors appointed E. Scott Beattie, Elizabeth Arden's former chairman, president, and chief executive officer, to serve as a member of Revlon's board of directors in the capacity of non-executive vice-chairman.

On June 16, 2022, its parent, Revlon, filed for Chapter 11 bankruptcy.
