= Britney's Dance Beat =

2002 video game

- North American PS2 cover art
- Developers: Metro (PS2); Hyperspace Cowgirls (PC); Art Co., Ltd (GBA)
- Publisher: THQ
- Directors: Tatsuo Okada (PS2); Nobuko Satoh (GBA)
- Producer: Jamie Bafus
- Composer: Hiroshi Kobayashi (PS2)
- Platforms: PlayStation 2; Game Boy Advance; Microsoft Windows
- Release: Game Boy Advance: NA: 26 March 2002; EU: 14 June 2002; PlayStation 2: NA: 9 May 2002; EU: 14 June 2002; Microsoft Windows: NA: 20 June 2002; EU: 5 July 2002
- Genres: Rhythm; Puzzle game; Music
- Modes: Single-player; multiplayer

Britney's Dance Beat is a rhythm game based around the music and videos of American singer Britney Spears. The game was developed by Metro Creative Graphics, Hyperspace Cowgirls, and Art Co., Ltd–published by THQ. The game was released for PlayStation 2 on 8 May 2002 in North America and 14 June 2002 in Europe.

The game contains five songs: "...Baby One More Time", "Oops!... I Did It Again", "Stronger", "Overprotected", and "I'm a Slave 4 U". Successful play is rewarded with "backstage passes" which unlocks features such as backstage video footage of Spears. There's also a video vault. When players complete auditions they get backstage passes to unlock 360 immersive videos and behind the scenes footage. The game also includes various remixes during behind the scenes footage, menus, and credits. It also has photoshoots during credits. Versions of the game were released for Game Boy Advance on 26 March 2002, PlayStation 2 on 9 May 2002, and Microsoft Windows on 20 June 2002. Early promotional materials mention a version for Mac computers, but it was never released.

== Gameplay ==
In Britney's Dance Beat, the player plays as an aspiring dancer who is auditioning for a spot as a backup dancer on her tour. One or two players compete for this opportunity through a series of rhythm games that take place on various make-shift stages consisting of different backdrops and usually featuring one of Britney's music videos playing in the background.

The game mechanics involve pressing the correct button on the controller in sync with a round radar monitor in the lower left of the screen. As the radar scan sweeps around the dial, it lights up the corresponding button on the controller that the player should push at that exact time. The player's accuracy is reflected in the dance moves performed by the avatar.

After beating each audition, the player is rewarded with backstage passes that unlock bonuses such as footage of Britney backstage at her concerts.

== Development ==
The development time for the game was more than 18 months.

== Reception ==
Reception

Aggregate scores
Aggregator	Score
GameRankings	(PS2) 63.29% (GBA) 57.75% (PC) 18%
Metacritic	(PS2) 63/100 (GBA) 53/100 (PC) 24/100

Review scores
Publication	Score
AllGame	3/5 (PC) 2/5
Edge	3/10
Electronic Gaming Monthly	2.83/10
Eurogamer	5/10
Game Informer	(GBA) 8/10 (PS2) 7.75/10
GamePro	4/5
GameSpot	(PS2) 6.9/10 (GBA) 6.4/10
GameSpy	(PS2) 70% (GBA) 53%
GameZone	3.5/10
IGN	(PS2) 5.5/10 (GBA) 5/10
Nintendo Power	2.8/5
Official U.S. PlayStation Magazine	4/5
PC Gamer (US)	18%
Entertainment Weekly	B+
Maxim	4/10

Reviews of the game are average. GameRankings and Metacritic gave it a score of 57.75% and 53 out of 100 for the GBA version, 63.29% and 63 out of 100 for the PS2 version, and 18% and 24 out of 100 for the PC version.

Entertainment Weekly gave the PS2 version a B+ and stated that "the game is just cheesy enough to make you stop, look, and bust out dancing." The Cincinnati Enquirer gave it a positive review and said of the game, "There's nothing groundbreaking about it, but in some ways, that's what keeps the game fun." However, Maxim gave the same console version a score of four out of ten and called it "a mindless version of 'Simon Says' to the masterful beats of 'Oops!... I Did It Again.'"
