= List of largest book deals =

This page provides a list of the largest deals for books and book series to date. It differentiates from the list of best-selling books in that book deals are secured before the book is released, and often before the book is completed. The books are listed according to the highest book deal estimate as reported in reliable, independent sources.

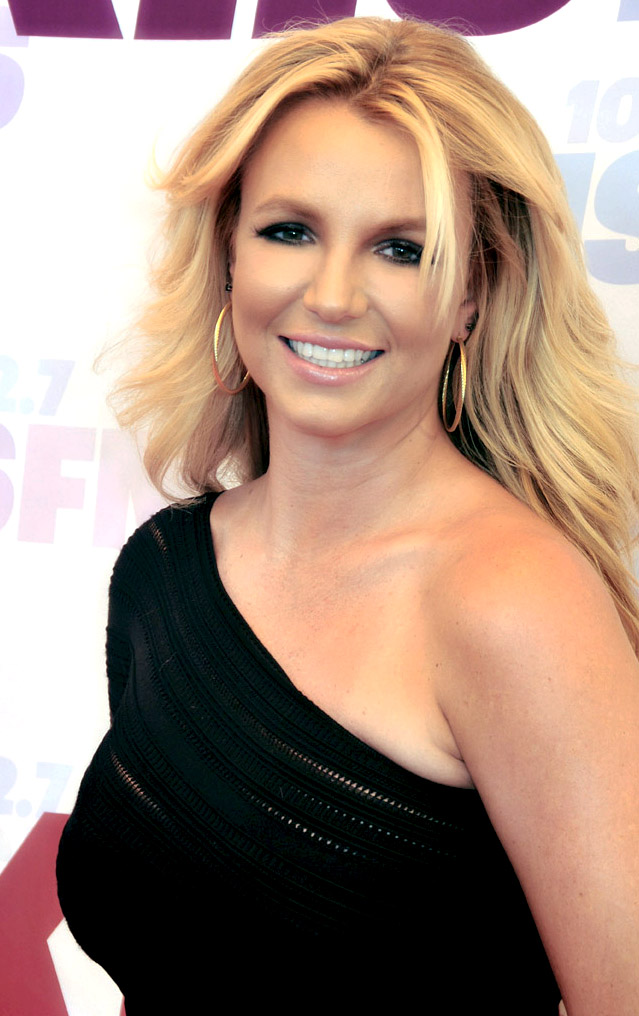
Politician Bill Clinton (left, pictured in 1993), and singer Britney Spears (right, pictured in 2013) hold the highest two spots for largest individual book deals.

American authors hold the record for the largest book deals made for individual books (Bill Clinton and Britney Spears), and for book series (James Patterson and Barack and Michelle Obama). While Patterson's book deal with Hachette Book Group is by far the largest for a book series, Patterson has disputed the reported amount.

Contrary to popular belief, J. K. Rowling's advances for the individual Harry Potter books or series overall do not appear on this list. For the first two books in the series (1997's Harry Potter and the Philosopher's Stone and 1998's Harry Potter and the Chamber of Secrets), she received an advance of £2,000 apiece. Rowling's later book The Casual Vacancy, released in 2012 and not affiliated with the Harry Potter series, does appear on this list.

== List of largest deals for individual books ==
These book deals share some facts in common: The top five book deals have been memoirs and their authors have all been American.

Note: book deals are listed at the time the book deal was made and not adjusted for inflation.

Book	Author	Author nationality	Original language	First published	Approximate deal	Genre
My Life	Bill Clinton	American	English	2004	$15 million	Memoir
The Woman in Me	Britney Spears	American	English	2023	$15 million	Memoir
Hard Choices	Hillary Clinton	American	English	2014	$14 million	Memoir
Born to Run	Bruce Springsteen	American	English	2016	$10 million	Memoir
The Girl with the Lower Back Tattoo	Amy Schumer	American	English	2016	$9 million	Memoir
Crossing the Threshold of Hope	Pope John Paul II	Vatican City	Italian	1994	$8.5 million	Nonfiction
Life	Keith Richards	British	English	2010	$7.3 million	Memoir
Back to Blood	Tom Wolfe	American	English	2008	$7 million	Novel
The Covenant of Water	Abraham Verghese	American	English	2023	$5 million	Novel
The Casual Vacancy	J. K. Rowling	British	English	2012	Between $2—$8 million	Crime fiction

== List of largest deals for books series ==
Note: book series deals are listed at the time the deal was made and not adjusted for inflation.

Book series	Number of books in series	Author(s)	Author(s) nationality	Original language	First published	Approximate deal	Genre
17 books (11 adult; 6 children's)	17	James Patterson	American	English	2009	$100—150 million (Note: While realiable sources list this amount as $100—150 million, Patterson has disputed this amount, stating it "isn't close". Patterson declined to say whether the amount was too high or too low.)	Crime fiction
Becoming and A Promised Land	2	Michelle Obama (Becoming); Barack Obama (A Promised Land)	American	English	2018 (Becoming); 2020 (A Promised Land)	$65 million+	Memoirs
Century trilogy (Fall of Giants, Winter of the World, and Edge of Eternity)	3	Ken Follett	British	English	2008 (Fall of Giants); 2012 (Winter of the World); 2014 (Edge of Eternity)	$50 million	Historical fiction
The Downing Street Years and The Path to Power	2	Margaret Thatcher	British	English	1993 (The Downing Street Years); 1995 (The Path to Power)	£3.5m	Memoirs

== See also ==
- List of best-selling fiction authors
- List of bestselling novels in the United States
- List of literary works by number of languages translated into
- Lists of books
