= Britney Spears: American Dream =

Role-playing game

- Developer: Glu Mobile
- Publisher: Glu Mobile
- Platforms: iOS, Android
- Release: May 13, 2016
- Genre: Casual role-playing game

Britney Spears: American Dream was a casual free-to-play role-playing game that was released on iOS and Android by the creators of Kim Kardashian: Hollywood, Glu Mobile. The game was released on May 13, 2016, in selected countries for testing, and released worldwide on May 18, 2016. In the game, the player's goal is to increase their fame and reputation, starting on the E-list and rising to the A-list. The game is fronted by American singer Britney Spears, featuring regular appearances from her character. The game was officially shut down May 13, 2022.

== Background ==
The name of the game was derived from a lyric in Britney's song, "Piece of Me", where she sings "I'm miss american dream, since I was seventeen". The instrumental track for "Piece of Me" can also be heard in-game during some tasks.

== Plot ==
The game opens with the player's character and Britney Spears in a flash-forward at Planet Hollywood during her Piece of Me residency, and they talk about how their career started. This flashes back to present-day in-game with them at Microbe Music where they are working, and their boss, Wallace, asks them to restock the CDs. Then, the player's character's best friend Sara Williams calls and alerts them of Britney's presence at Starbeans.

The player's character asks Wallace to leave early, which he agrees on, and the player's character visits Starbeans to see Britney ordering a Strawberry Whippaccino. They then ask the barista, Astrid to sing at the open mic. She agrees, and they perform for Britney. She tells the player's character that she loves their voice, and invites them to a party at String to meet some important people.

At String, she introduces the player's character to Anne Means, a powerful talent manager. Anne tells them to get a gig at The Venom Room, and then follow up with her, so they are off to the Venom Room. They see Della Jackson there looking for a replacement for Aston Kole, who was a no-show. The player's character convinces her to let them perform in Aston's place, and once they do, they gain their first fans.

However, when they go outside, they get into a heated argument with Aston, who then becomes their rival in the game. After these events, the player's character heads to Anne's office for an audition. She agrees to represent them and tells them to record a single at Sound Town, so they record their debut single immediately, and soon they are charting on the global charts - this is the beginning of their path to fame.

== Gameplay ==
In Britney Spears: American Dream, players aim to increase their reputation by customizing pop stars-in-the-making and bring them up from performing local gigs to climbing the ladder of success with all the business' glitz and glamor. Users record hit singles, design their own single cover art, dine at Koi Restaurant, fend off rival singers and perform at a range of venues from the local coffee shop all the way up to Spears' stage at the Planet Hollywood in Las Vegas.
