= Avery (surname) =

- Language: English

Origin
- Languages: Anglo Norman, Old English, Norman French, French

Avery is an English name ultimately derived from the Old English name Ælfred (Old English form of Alfred), which literally translates to 'elf-counsel'

The surname Avery may also be a derivation of the French place name Évreux.

== Prevalence in England ==
In 2014, the name's frequency was highest in Devon (5.9 times the British average), followed by Sussex, Buckinghamshire, Rutland, Worcestershire, Oxfordshire, Kent, Warwickshire, Cornwall and Somerset.

== Notable people with the name ==
=== Activism ===
- Byllye Avery (born 1937), American health care activist
- Brian Avery (activist) (born 1979), American human rights activist
- Greg Avery, British animal rights activist
- Rachel Foster Avery (1858–1919), American suffragist
- Rosa Miller Avery (1830–1894), American abolitionist, political reformer, suffragist, writer; mother-in-law of Rachel Foster Avery

=== Art and media ===
- Brad Avery, guitarist for the rock band Third Day
- Catharine H. T. Avery (1844–1911), American author, editor, educator
- Charles Avery (actor) (1873–1926), American silent-film actor, film director, and screenwriter
- Charles Avery (artist) (born 1973), Scottish artist from Oban
- Charles Avery (pianist) (1892–1974), American blues and boogie-woogie pianist
- Eric Avery (born 1965), American musician
- Fiona Avery (born 1974), American comic book and television writer
- Frances Avery (1910–2006), American visual artist, photographer, and teacher
- George Avery (professor) (1926–2004), American professor of German Studies
- Gillian Avery (1926–2016), British children's writer and scholar
- Harold Avery (1867–1943), British author of children's literature
- Jack Avery, member of the American pop band Why Don't We
- James Avery (1945–2013), American actor
- James Avery (musician) (1937–2009), American and German pianist and conductor
- Margaret Avery (fl. 1970s–present), American singer and actress
- Patricia Avery (1902–1973), American silent film actress
- Phyllis Avery (1922–2011), American actress
- Shondrella Avery (fl. 1990s–present), American actress
- Tom Avery (born 1975), explorer, mountaineer, author, and motivational speaker
- Val Avery (1924–2009), American actor
- Valeen Tippetts Avery (1936–2006), American biographer and historian
- Milton Avery (1885–1965), American Modernist painter
- Tex Avery (1908-1980), animator and director; creator of Bugs Bunny and Daffy Duck
- Susanna Avery-Quash (born 1970), English art historian
- Alex Avery (born 1971), English actor

=== Government and politics ===
- Bill Avery (born 1940), American politician and professor from Nebraska
- Carlos Avery (1868–1930), American newspaper publisher and politician from Minnesota
- Christopher L. Avery (1872–1956), American judge from Connecticut
- Cyrus Avery (1871–1963), American highway commissioner
- Isaac E. Avery (1828–1863), Confederate Army colonel during the American Civil War
- James Avery (American colonist) (1620–1700), Connecticut colonist, legislator, and military commander
- John Avery (politician) (1824–1914), American politician and physician from Michigan
- John Keith Avery (1927–2018), Australian law enforcement official from New South Wales
- Matthew Avery (1834–?), American politician from Alabama
- Michael T. Avery (1952–2023), American politician from Nebraska
- Oscar F. Avery (1841–1924), American politician and attorney from Illinois
- Waightstill Avery (1741–1821), American politician from North Carolina and colonel during the American Revolutionary War
- William H. Avery (politician) (1911–2009), American politician from Kansas
- William T. Avery (1819–1880), American politician from Tennessee

=== Science and engineering ===
- Clarence W. Avery (1882–1949), engineer at Ford Motor Company
- John Scales Avery (1933–2024), theoretical chemist and peace activist
- Oswald Avery (1877–1955), Canadian-American physician and scientist
- R. Stanton Avery, (1907–1997), American inventor
- Ray Avery (scientist) (born 1947), New Zealand pharmaceutical scientist, inventor, author and social entrepreneur
- Robert Hanneman Avery, founder of the Avery Company, an American farm tractor, truck and automobile manufacturer
- William C. Avery (1831–1894), American physician and naturalist
- William H. Avery (engineer) (1912–2004), aeronautics engineer

=== Sports ===
- Albert Avery(1883–1914), English rugby league footballer
- Donnie Avery (born 1984), American football player
- Genard Avery (born 1995), American football player
- George Avery Young (1866–1900), English sportsman who played rugby and cricket
- Gordon George Avery (1925–2006), Australian track and field athlete
- James Avery (baseball) (born 1984) Canadian baseball player
- Jim Avery (American football) (born 1944), American football player
- John Avery (gridiron football) (born 1976), Canadian football player
- Nathaniel "Iron Man" Avery (1939–1985), golf caddie, notably for Arnold Palmer
- Ryan Avery (born 1982), former lacrosse player
- Sean Avery (born 1980), Canadian professional hockey player
- Steve Avery (baseball) (born 1970), former Major League Baseball pitcher
- Tre Avery (born 1997), American football player
- Will Avery (basketball) (born 1979), professional basketball player
- Xavier Avery (born 1990), American baseball player

=== Other ===
- Bryan Avery (1944–2017), British architect
- Clark Moulton Avery (1819–1864), Confederate colonel
- Ephraim Kingsbury Avery (1799–1869), Methodist minister accused of an 1832 murder
- Helen Avery (1938–2016), Australian businesswomen
- Henry Every (or Avery), 17th-century pirate
- James Avery (Medal of Honor) (1825–1898) Union Navy seaman and recipient of the Medal of Honor during the American Civil War
- Peter Avery (1923–2008), Fellow of King's College, Cambridge
- R. Stanton Avery (1907–1997), founder of Avery Dennison Corporation and namesake of Caltech's Avery House
- Samuel Putnam Avery, (1822–1904) American connoisseur and dealer in art
- Sewell Avery (1874–1960), American businessman
- Steven Avery (born 1962), American exonerated by DNA evidence for a crime
- William Beilby Avery (1854–1908), philatelist

== Fictional characters ==
- Jackson Avery, in the TV series Grey's Anatomy, or his grandfather, Harper Avery

== See also ==
- Averin (surname) (Аверины), a Russian surname
- Every (surname)
- Justice Avery, multiple people
