= Every (surname) =

Origin
- Language: English
- Region of origin: England, Wales

Other names
- Variant forms: Everiy, Everye, Evry, Everie, Evarie, Avery, Avary, Yvery

Every is an English surname. It may be of Norman origin and derived from "Évreux", a county in Normandy. The Every baronets of Egginton, a branch of the Every family of southwest England, are claimed to be a branch of the noble house of Yvery, of Norman extraction. The earliest surviving records of the name "Every" date to 12 April 1591, when one John Every married Elizabeth Ouzely at St Dunstan's, Stepney.

Some suggest alternatively that it may be come from Eber or Ivri, the descendant of Noah's son Shem and the ancestor of Abraham. Eber's name is found on some of the earliest known examples of Sumerian writing.

== People ==
- Dernell Every (1909–1994), American fencer
- Edward Every (1862–1941), Anglican missionary bishop
- George Every (1909–2003), British historian and theologian
- Henry Every (c.1659–?), English pirate
- John Every (1643–1679), English landowner and politician
- Matt Every (born 1983), American golfer
- Trevor Every (1909–1990), Welsh cricketer
- Every baronets, which includes a list of baronets with the surname:
  - Sir Simon Every, 1st Baronet (1603–1647), English politician

== See also ==
- Van Every
