= Henry Every (disambiguation) =

Henry Every was an English pirate.

Henry Every may also refer to:

- Sir Henry Every, 2nd Baronet (1629–1700), of the Every baronets
- Sir Henry Every, 3rd Baronet (1653–1709), of the Every baronets
- Sir Henry Every, 6th Baronet (1708–1755), of the Every baronets
- Sir Henry Every, 9th Baronet (1777–1855), of the Every baronets
- Sir Henry Flower Every, 10th Baronet (1830–1893), of the Every baronets
- Sir Henry John Michael Every, 13th Baronet (born 1947), of the Every baronets

== See also ==
- Every (surname)
