= Brian Avery =

Brian or Bryan Avery may refer to:

- Brian Avery (activist) (born 1979), American activist
- Brian Avery (actor) (born 1940), American actor
- Bryan Avery (1944–2017), British architect

== See also ==
- Avery (surname)
