= Manor House, Worthington =

Listed building in Greater Manchester, England

Manor House
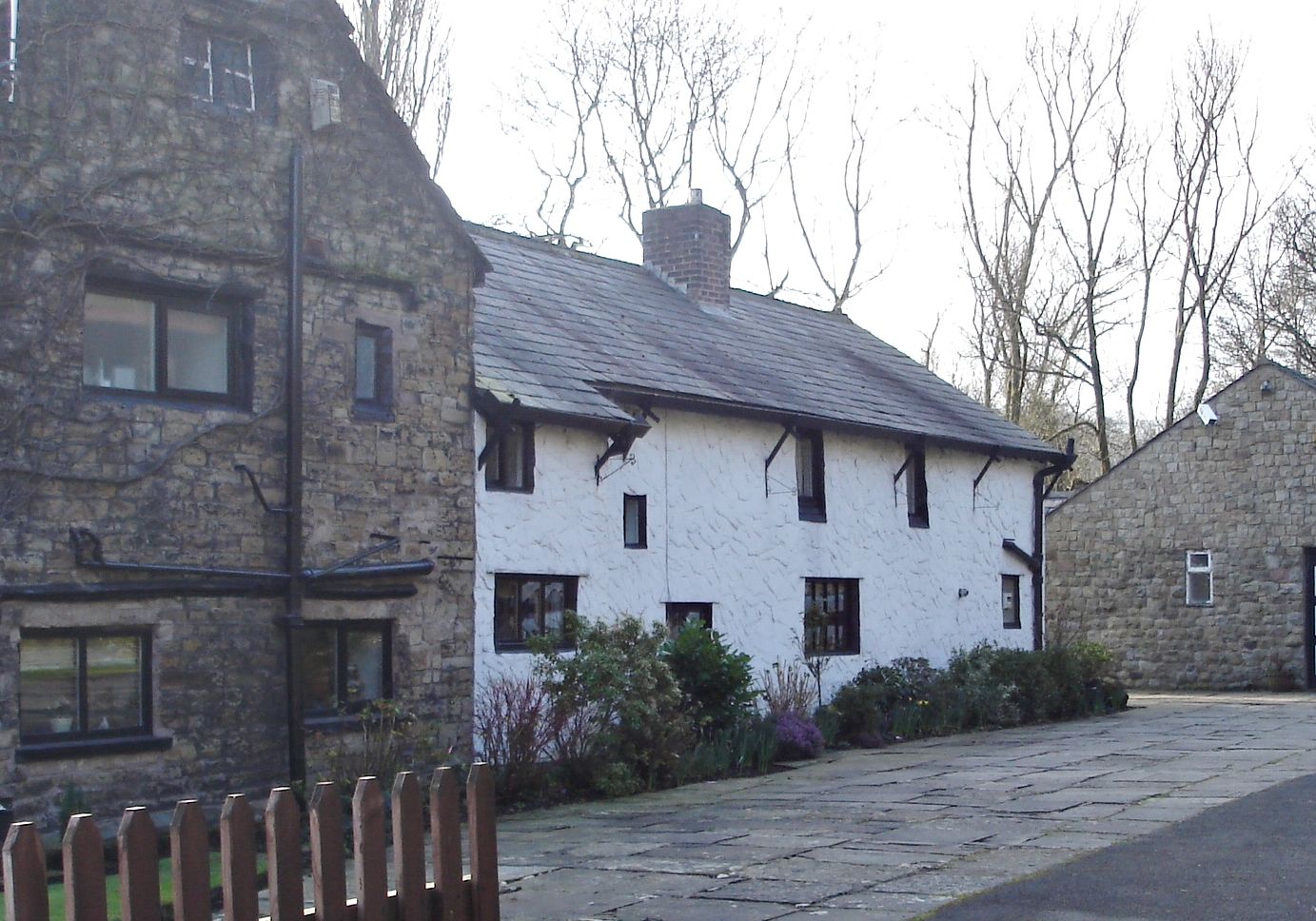
- Manor House in 2014

- Location within Greater Manchester

General information
- Architectural style: Vernacular
- Location: Chorley Road, Worthington, Greater Manchester, England
- Coordinates: 53.5868°N 2.6375°W
- Year built: 17th century (or earlier)

Listed Building – Grade II*
- Official name: Manor House
- Designated: 22 February 1967
- Reference no.: 1228480

Manor House is a Grade II* listed building on Chorley Road in the civil parish of Worthington, within the Metropolitan Borough of Wigan, Greater Manchester, England. Historically part of Lancashire, it is one of three listed buildings in the parish, which is predominantly rural.

== History ==
Manor House dates from the 17th century or earlier, with later alterations and extensions. It reflects the long-standing settlement history of Worthington, which was historically part of the ancient parish of Standish in Lancashire. The Worthington family held the manor from the medieval period until the late 17th century, and the house is associated with their occupation of the estate.

On 22 February 1967, Manor House was designated a Grade II* listed building for its architectural and historic significance. Manor House is currently in use as a private residence and is not open to the public.

== Architecture ==
The house is constructed partly in stone and partly in brick, with a roof of mixed slate and stone-slate. It has two storeys and five bays, with the fourth and fifth bays projecting forward, gabled, and containing attics. The first three bays contain casement windows, while the projecting bays have mullioned windows with hood moulds. Internally, surviving features include a partly exposed cruck truss, an inglenook fireplace, and a bressummer beam.

== See also ==
- Grade II* listed buildings in Greater Manchester
- Listed buildings in Worthington, Greater Manchester
