= Avary =

Avary is a surname. Notable people with the surname include:

- Bryce Avary, see The Rocket Summer
- Myrta Lockett Avary (1857–1946), American white supremacist, author, and journalist
- Roger Avary (born 1965), Canadian-American producer, screenwriter, and director

== See also ==
- Avery (surname)
