= Worthington family =

Historic family from Lancashire, England

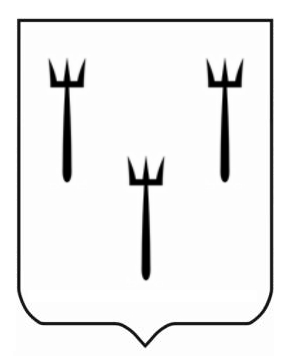
The Worthington Coat of Arms

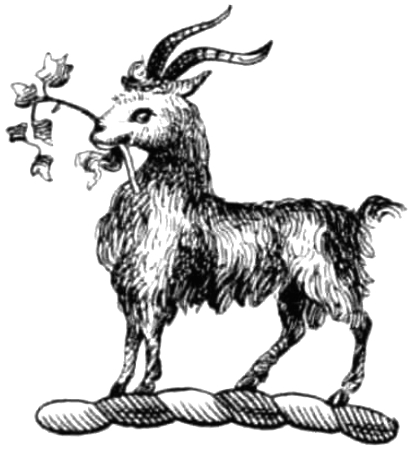
The Worthington Crest

The Worthingtons are a historic English family from Lancashire, traceable to the early 13th century. The progenitor of the line was Worthington de Worthington (born 1236), and the family served as Lords of the Manor of Worthington, Standish, Lancashire, from the 13th to the 18th centuries. Their family seat was Worthington Hall, in Standish, Lancashire, which was partially demolished in the mid-20th century. The remaining Tudor doorway, dated 1577, is associated with Edward de Worthington.

Since the mid-16th century, they have been maternal ancestors of the Brice family, who often use Worthington as a given name. Other Worthington descendants later became the Worthington-Evans baronets and the Craven baronets. They also have connections through marriage to the Earl of Aylesford, the Lawson Baronets, Baron Jeffreys, Baron Stafford, and Baron Feversham.

== Coat of arms ==
Dating from the 15th century, the Worthington coat of arms is argent, three dung forks sable. The arms can be considered a rebus, as "worthing" was an archaic slang term for dung. The crest is a goat statant argent, holding in the mouth an oak branch vert, fructed or; the motto is, "Virtute Dignus Avorum" ("in virtue worthy of ones ancestors"). The motto and coat of arms may be seen in Chorley Church, Wilmslow Parish, Cheshire, England.

== Links ==
Worthington Family History Society
