= Every family =

Baronetcy in the Baronetage of England

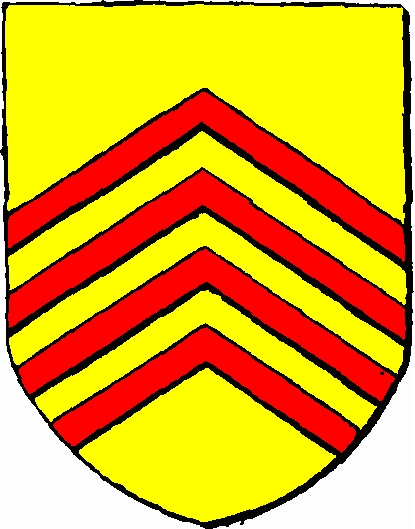
The coat of arms of the Every family

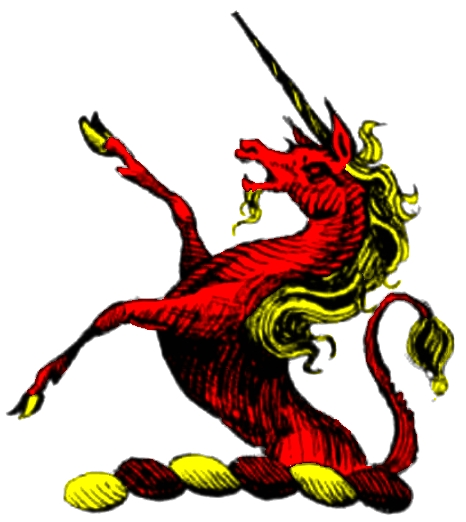
The heraldic crest of the Every family

The Everys are an historic English family from the West Country (specifically Devon, Dorset and Somerset), with later members settling in South East England, traceable to the late 12th century and maternal cousins to the Brice family. They were significant landowners in Devon, particularly in Chardstock and Shepton Beauchamp, and as Lords of the manor of Wootton Abbotts. The family seats were Wycroft Castle, Wootton Abbotts manor house, and Egginton Hall. On 26 May 1641 a branch of the family developed into the Every baronets, and the late 17th-century English pirate Henry Every is believed to have descended from an earlier line.

== History ==
The progenitor of the Every line was John Avery, of Bodmin, born around the beginning of the 16th century (although the Averys have been widespread in the West Country since at least the 12th century). He had at least two sons, one of whom (John) was Serjeant-at-arms in the reign of Queen Elizabeth I, (and whose descendants would become the Every Baronets), the other of whom would become a considerable landowner, siring the Everys of Wycroft Castle.

=== Everys of Wycroft Castle ===
The children of this other son, through commerce, became holders of significant estates (including Wycroft Castle in Axminster and the manor of Wooton Abbotts). After the deaths of William and Alexander Every the estates, through inheritance, merged. The line continued as the Everys of Wycroft Castle, named for what was now the family seat of Wycroft (or Wicroft) Castle in Devon, previously the seat of the Creuse family. Since the 16th century the Everys of Wycroft Castle have been maternal ancestors of the Brice family (after the marriage of Joan Every to Worthington Brice in Dinnington, Somerset), making the Brices cousins to the Everys.

=== Every baronets, of Egginton ===
The Every Baronetcy, of Egginton in the County of Derby, is a title in the Baronetage of England. It was created on 26 May 1641 for Simon Every, Member of Parliament for Leicester in 1640 and a supporter of the Royalist cause in the Civil War. Born into the Everys of Wycroft Castle, at Chardstock, Devon, he married Anne, daughter and co-heir of Sir Henry Leigh, of Egginton, Derbyshire. After his marriage, Every settled at Egginton.

The family seat of Egginton Hall burnt down in 1736, and was replaced by the eighth baronet (the great-great-grandson of the fourth) with a new house, which was demolished in the 1950s.

- Sir Simon Every, 1st Baronet (1603–1647)
- Sir Henry Every, 2nd Baronet (1629–1700)
- Sir Henry Every, 3rd Baronet (1653–1709)
- Sir John Every, 4th Baronet (1654–1729)
- Sir Simon Every, 5th Baronet (1658–1753)
- Sir Henry Every, 6th Baronet (1708–1755)
- Sir John Every, 7th Baronet (1708–1779)
- Sir Edward Every, 8th Baronet (1754–1786)
- Sir Henry Every, 9th Baronet (1777–1855)
- Sir Henry Flower Every, 10th Baronet (1830–1893)
- Sir Edward Oswald Every, 11th Baronet (1886–1959)
- Sir John Simon Every, 12th Baronet (1914–1988)
- Sir Henry John Michael Every, 13th Baronet (born 1947)

The heir apparent to the baronetcy is the 13th Baronet's eldest son, Edward James Henry Every (born 1975).

=== Henry Every, pirate ===
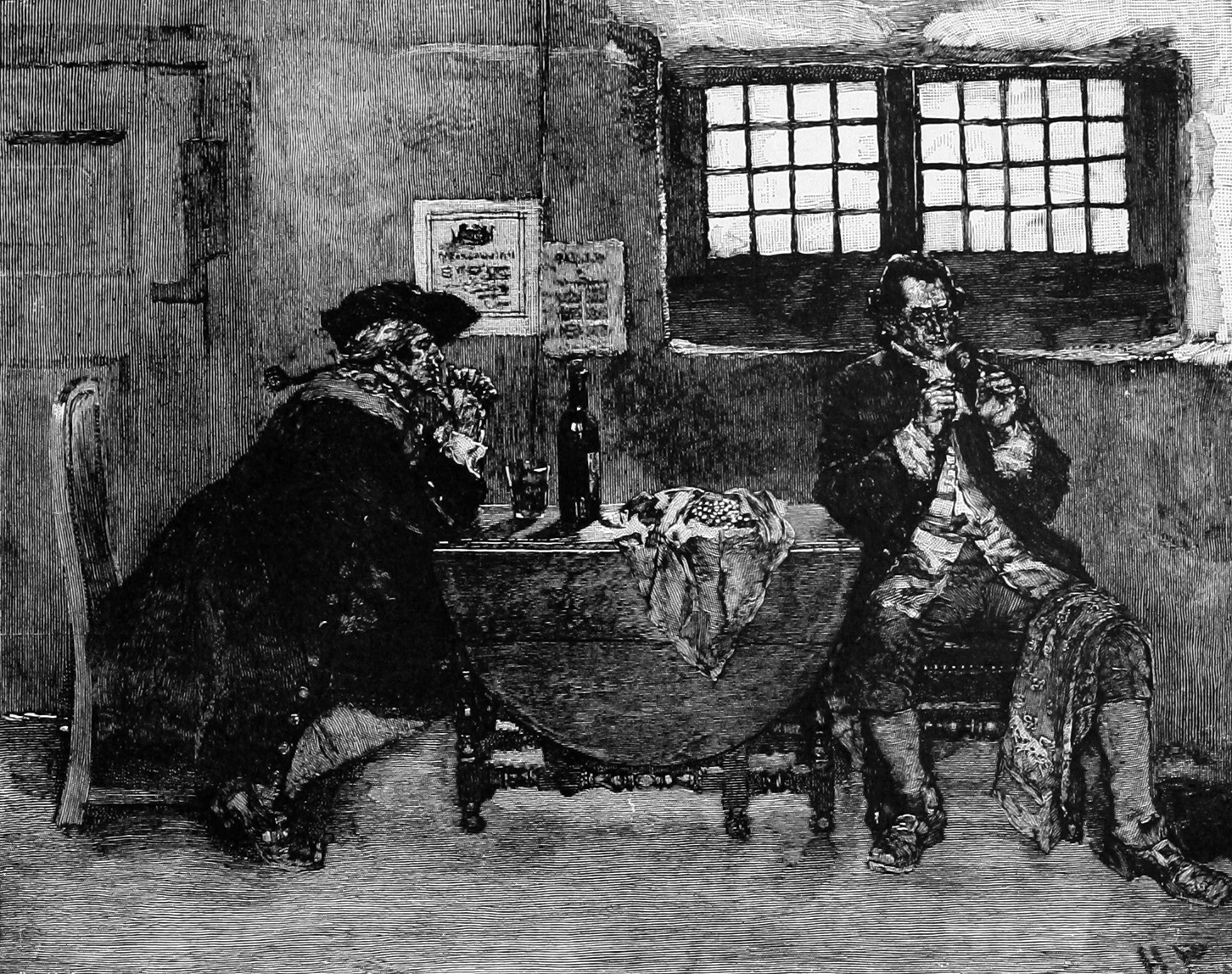
The pirate Henry Every selling his jewellery, from Buccaneers and Marooners of the Spanish Main (1887)

Scholars have traced a possible descent from the West Country Everys for the late 17th-century English pirate Henry Every. He is thought to have been the son of John Evarie (spelling uncertain) and his wife, Anne (maiden name unknown), cousins of the Everys of Wycroft Castle based in the Devon village of Newton Ferrers, 9.7 kilometres (6 mi) southeast of Plymouth. Modern scholarship suggests that Henry was born on 23 August 1659; according to the deposition of William Phillips, a member of Every's crew who gave a "voluntary confession" after his capture, in August 1696 Every was "aged about 40 years," his mother lived "near Plymouth," and his wife was a periwig seller who lived "in Ratcliffe Highway." Every was married and records indicate that he may have wed one Dorothy Arther at St James Duke's Place in London on 11 September 1690, though there is no evidence that he had any children.

== Notable family members ==
John Every was Serjeant-at-arms to Queen Elizabeth 1 (Calendar of Patent Rolls 3rd Aplr 1571 *Grant for life to John Everie of the office of sergeant of arms" for his services to Henry VIII, Edward VI, Queen Mary and the present Queen, By P.S.".), which was the oldest form of Guard to the Sovereign and arrested traitors and offenders around the Royal Court. Their official authority being a Mace, in the reign of Queen Elizabeth I. In the 17th century Worthington Brice and his son John (son and grandson of Joan Every of Wycroft Castle, respectively) fought with the Cavaliers during the English Civil Wars, receiving fines for doing so during the Interregnum. Henry Every (of Devonshire) rose to prominence in the late 17th century as a pirate who operated in the Atlantic and Indian oceans, later made famous in numerous published works. The fourth baronet was a captain in the Royal Navy and a supporter of William III. He was High Sheriff of Derbyshire in 1718. The fifth baronet was Rector of Eggington and of Navenby, Lincolnshire. The sixth baronet was High Sheriff of Derbyshire in 1749. The seventh Baronet was Rector of Waddington, Lincolnshire. The eighth baronet was High Sheriff of Derbyshire in 1783. The current baronet was High Sheriff for 2009.

== Coats of arms ==
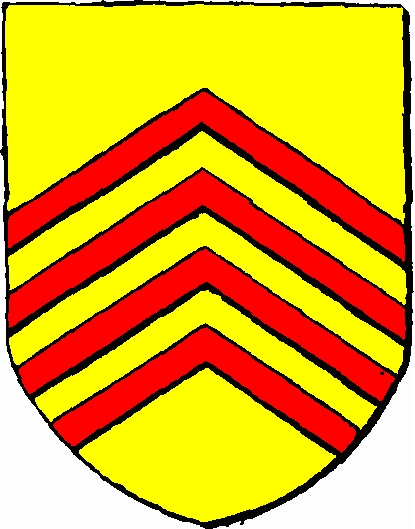
Every of Wycroft Castle

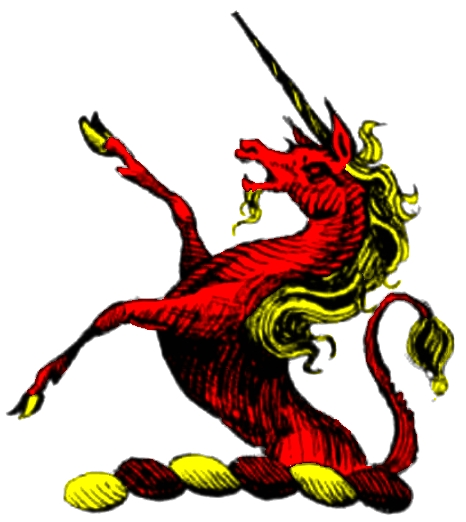
Every of Wycroft Castle

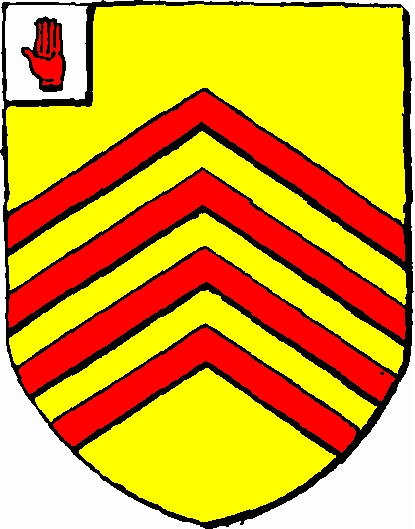
Every Baronets of Egginton

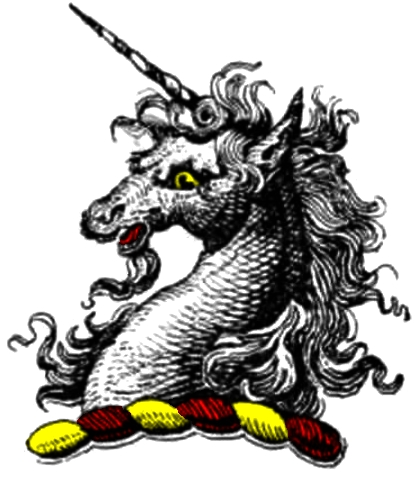
Every Baronets of Egginton

The recorded coat of arms for the Every family of Wycroft Castle (granted 1604) is or, four chevronels gules; the crest being a demi-unicorn couped gules, maned, tired, hoofed or. The Baronets of Egginton add the Red Hand of Ulster as a blazon to denote their title, and have as a crest a unicorns head couped proper.
