= Justice Avery =

Justice Avery may refer to:

- Edward Avery (judge) (1790–1866), associate justice of the Supreme Court of Ohio
- Christopher L. Avery (1872–1956), associate justice of the Connecticut Supreme Court
- Coleman W. Avery (1880–1938), associate justice of the Supreme Court of Ohio
- Alphonso Calhoun Avery (1835–1913), associate justice of the North Carolina Supreme Court

== See also ==
- Horace Avory (1851–1935), English High Court judge
