= Glide (automobile) =

Defunct American motor vehicle manufacturer

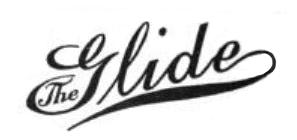

Overview
- Manufacturer: Bartholomew Company
- Production: 1902–1925 about 4500 produced
- Designer: John B. Bartholomew

Body and chassis
- Class: Entry-level car
- Body style: Tonneau and Sedan

Powertrain
- Engine: 1-cylinder, 2-cylinder, Straight-4, 6-cylinder

Dimensions
- Wheelbase: 119 inches (3,000 mm), 132 inches (3,400 mm)

Chronology
- Successor: Avery Company

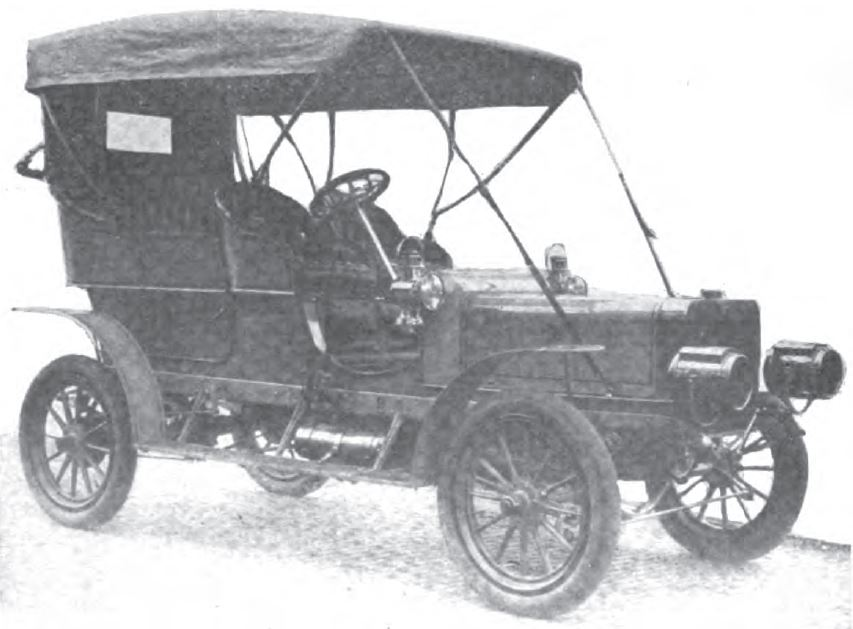
1906 Glide Model E

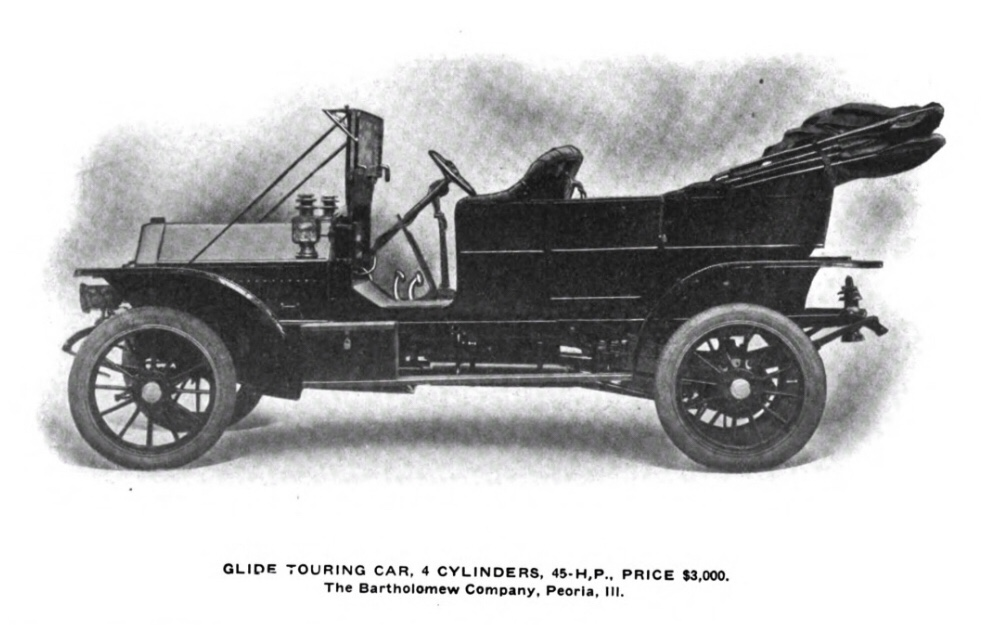
Glide Model G (1907-1909)

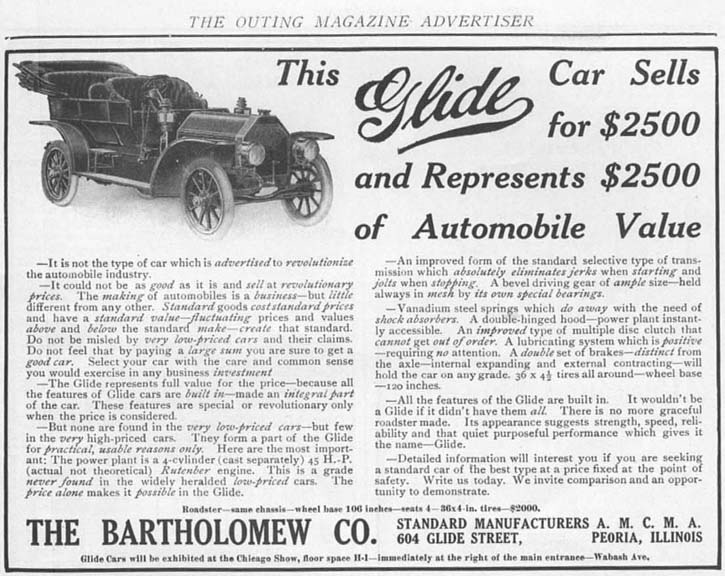
1909 advertisement for the Glide automobile manufactured in Peoria, Illinois, by the Bartholomew Company.

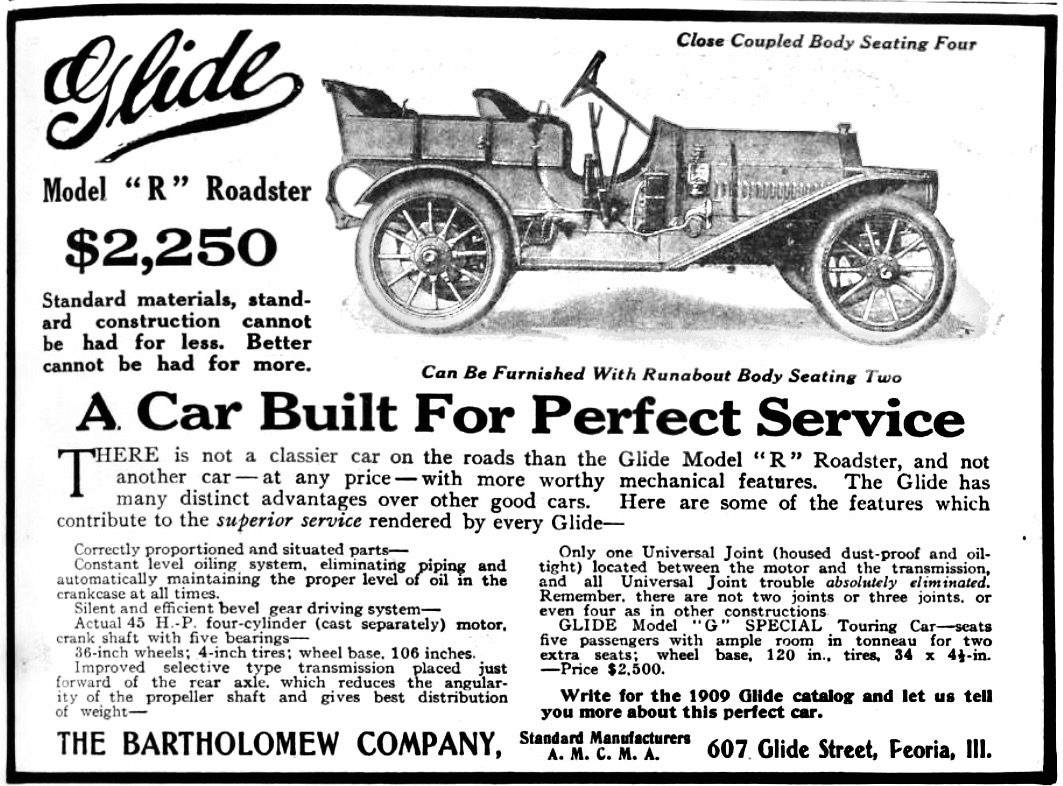
Glide Model R (1909)

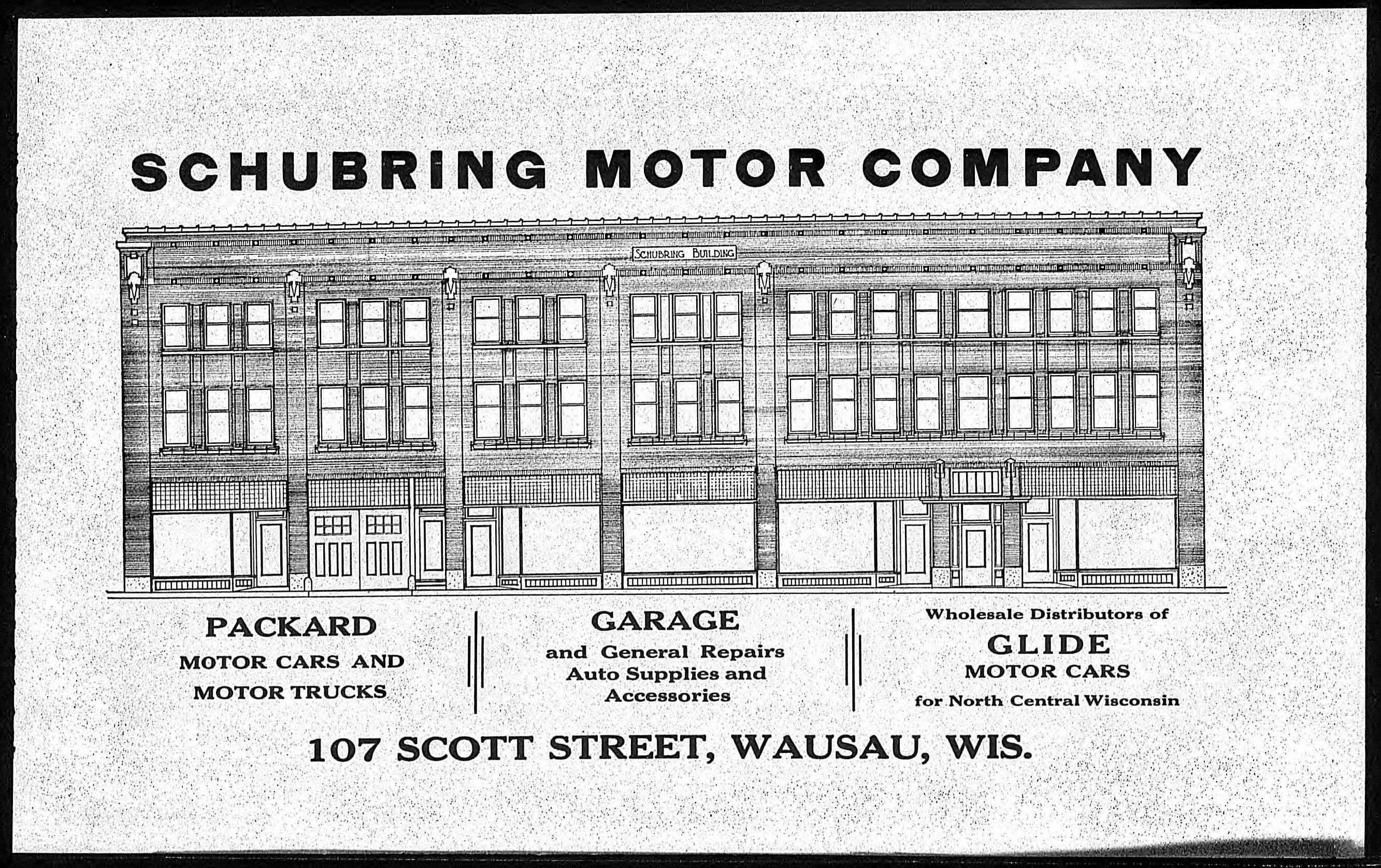
1916 Advertisement for a Wausau Wisconsin Glide Dealership serving North Central Wisconsin

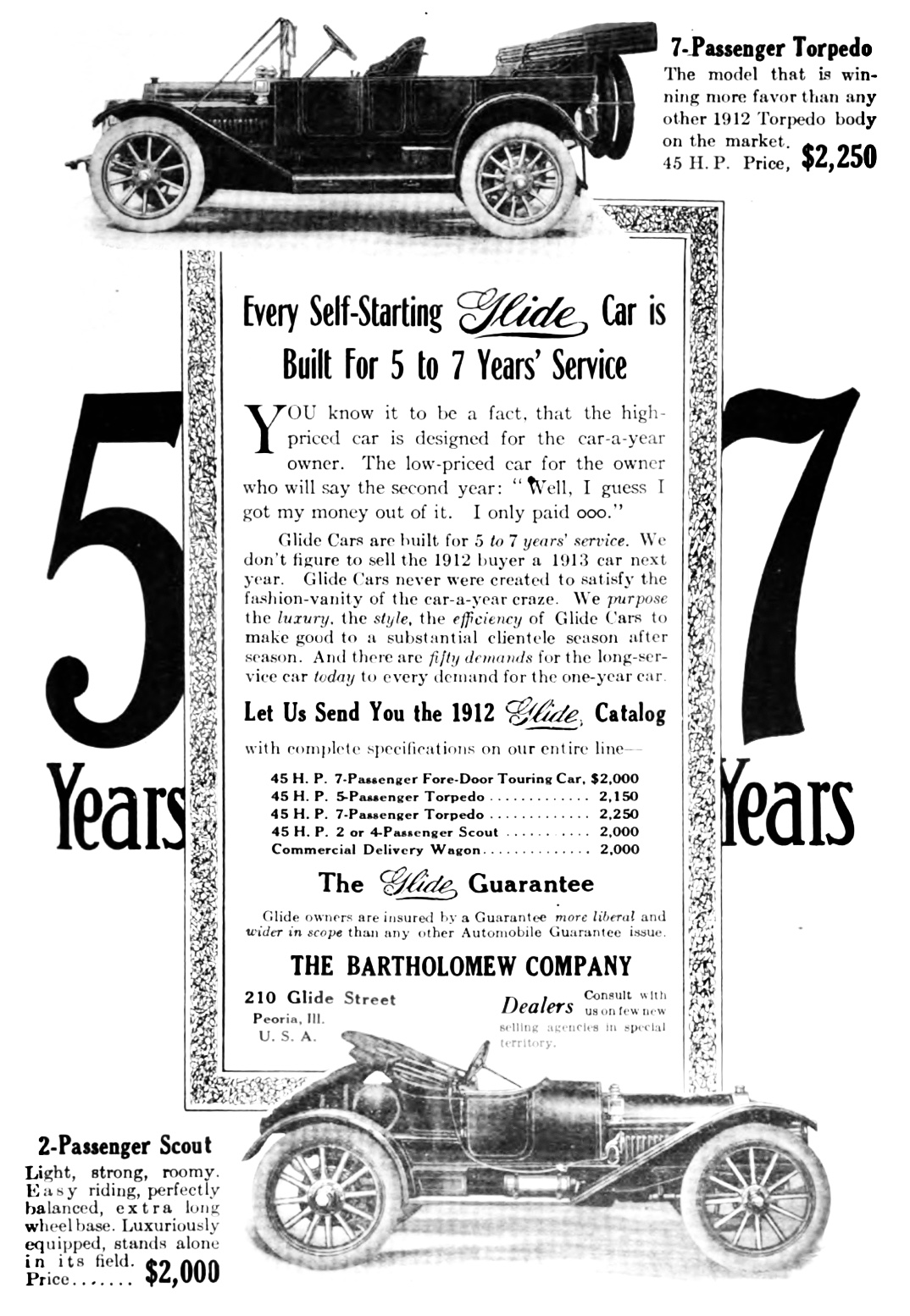
Glide Model 45 (1910-1913)

The Glide automobile was an American automobile manufactured by the Bartholomew Company in Peoria Heights, Illinois beginning in 1902. Founded by John B. Bartholomew, the company continued to produce automobiles until 1920, when the company began manufacturing trucks for the Avery Company, of which Bartholomew was also president.

== Company origins ==
J. B. Bartholomew started with the Avery Company in Galesburg, Illinois on December 8, 1879 driving a team to haul lumber for a US$1.10 per day. In 1882 the Avery company purchased 18 acres (73,000 m^{2}) in Peoria, Illinois and moved the business there to North Adams and North Jefferson Streets. In 1892, Robert Avery, the president of the Avery Co., died and Bartholomew was made vice-president.

He had for the prior ten years been in Des Moines, Iowa, managing one of the Avery Co. plants, and where he also built up a small side business, the Bartholomew Company, to manufacture popcorn and peanut roasters and wagons. Upon his return to Peoria to become vice president of the Avery Company, he continued his side business. In 1900, he moved the company's manufacturing facility to a new facility on the 300-500 block of Glide Avenue in Peoria.

== Models produced ==
In 1901 Batholomew began experimenting with automobile manufacturing, and in 1902 he added automobiles to the Bartholomew Company production line. Their slogan was "Ride in a Glide, Then Decide." They made a total of seven models, though never more than 500 cars in a year, and usually less. The first car was a 6 hp (4.5 kW) single-cylinder tiller-steered runabout named the Glidemobile. By 1904, they had added a steering wheel and increased the engine to 8 hp (6.0 kW). The engine was positioned horizontally under the seat, featured a single chain-drive and an optional tonneau top. The two-seater sold for US$750, and the tonneau top for US$850. About 25 were sold in 1903 and twice that in 1904.

In 1905 they introduced a 14 hp 2-cylinder engine and in 1906 a 36 hp 4-cylinder front-mounted engine. They stopped making single- and two-cylinder engines in 1906, and in 1907 they added a 50/60 hp 6-cylinder Model H. This was mounted on a 132 inches (3,400 mm) wheelbase and sold for US$3500. In 1908, the company stock was worth $200,000. The cars were sold through dealers in Des Moines, New Orleans, Boston, San Francisco, New York City, Butte (Montana), Washington D.C., Indianapolis, Allegheny (Pennsylvania), Wausau (Wisconsin) and Montreal.

The Model H was made for only two years, and from 1909-1915 the cars featured a 4-cylinder, 45 hp (34 kW) engine, shaft drive, and several bodies including roadster or tourer makes. They began offering a closed car for the first time in 1916, when they also returned to offering a 6-cylinder engine. They produced about 200 cars per year, until 1916 when this rose to about 500 autos. The new Model 6-40 offered a smaller 40 hp (30 kW) engine than the Model H, on a 119 inches (3,000 mm) wheelbase. This sold for US$1095 as a tourer body and US$1295 as a sedan. This model remained largely the same through 1920.

== Overview of production figures ==
Year	Production	Model	Serial number
1903	25		
1904	50		
1905	100		
1906	150		
1907	175	G	
1908	200	G	
1909	200	G	
1910	200	45	
1911	200	45, Glide Special 45; Glide Scout	
1912	200	45	
1913	200	45	
1914	200	25	7100 to 7300
	201	36	5300 to 5500
1915	301	30	7300 to 7600
1916	501	40	9000 to 9500
1917	500	40	9501 to 10000
1918	551	40	10000 to 10550
1919	200		10551 to
1920	25		
Sum	≈ 3.925		

== Absorbed into Avery Company ==
In 1920, as competition from Buick and Studebaker increased, Bartholomew decided to bring the plant into the Avery Company fold and it was utilized to manufacture trucks. Avery Company employed four thousand people by this point, but went into bankruptcy and receivership in 1923. President J. B. Bartholomew died in 1924.

== See also ==
- List of automobile manufacturers
- List of defunct United States automobile manufacturers
