= Brice family =

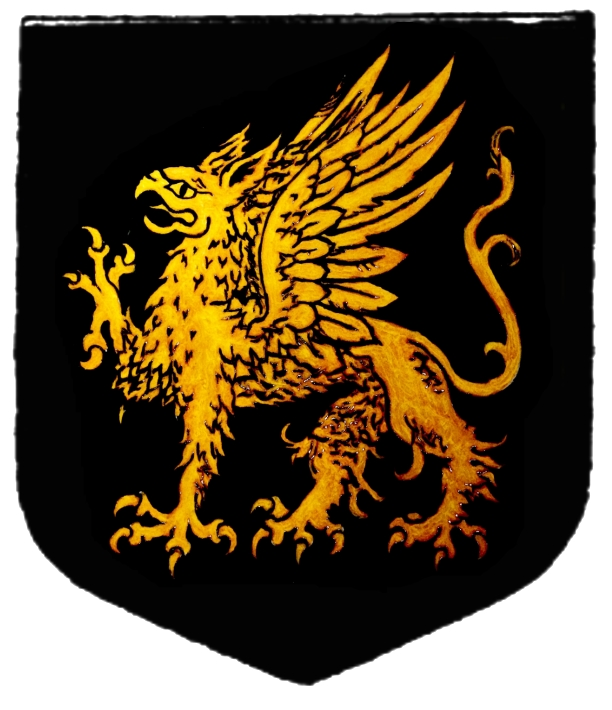
The Brice coat of arms, granted 1573: Sable, a griffin passant, or

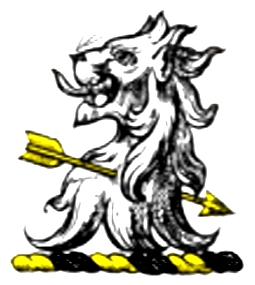
One version of the Brice crest: A lions head erased, ermine, pierced with an arrow, or

The Brices are a historic English family from Somerset, traceable to the late 13th century, and maternal cousins to the Spencers, the Every baronets, and the Worthingtons of Worthington Hall. They were significant landowners in Somerset, particularly in Chard and Kingstone Allowenshay, and as Lords of the manor of Dinnington. The family seat was Dinnington Manor House (now Frog Farm), and multiple Brice monuments and tombs survive in the Dinninton parish church of St. Nicholas.

== History ==
The Brices can be found in Somerset as early as 1260, with a Henry Brice mentioned in the deeds for Glastonbury. John Brice fought and died at the Battle of Crecy in 1346, and his son William fought at the Battle of Poitiers ten years later. By 1322 the Brices had established themselves as major landowners in Dinnington, and remained active and prominent in the West Country for centuries after. Though a string of aristocratic marriages in the 16th century helped secure the family's social position, their decline in fortune came as a result of siding with the royalist cause against Oliver Cromwell during the English Civil War, for which Worthington Brice, his son John, and his cousin Simon Every received severe fines during the interregnum.

== Coat of arms ==
In 1573 a coat of arms was granted to Hugh Brice, husband of Elizabeth Spencer, father of Hugh Brice. The arms are sable, a griffin passant, or; the crest, a lions head erased, ermine, pierced with an arrow, or. Crest variations include the specific colouring of the arrow, which alternates between azure, or, and a combination of the two.

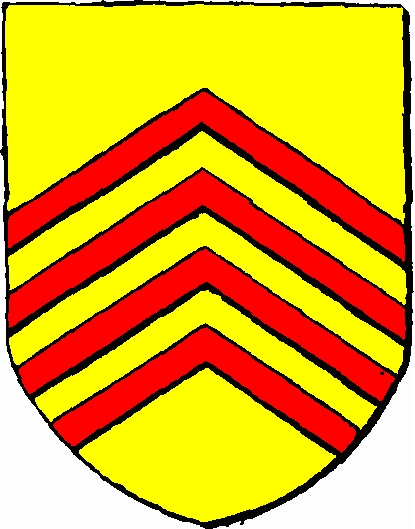
Every of Wycroft Castle

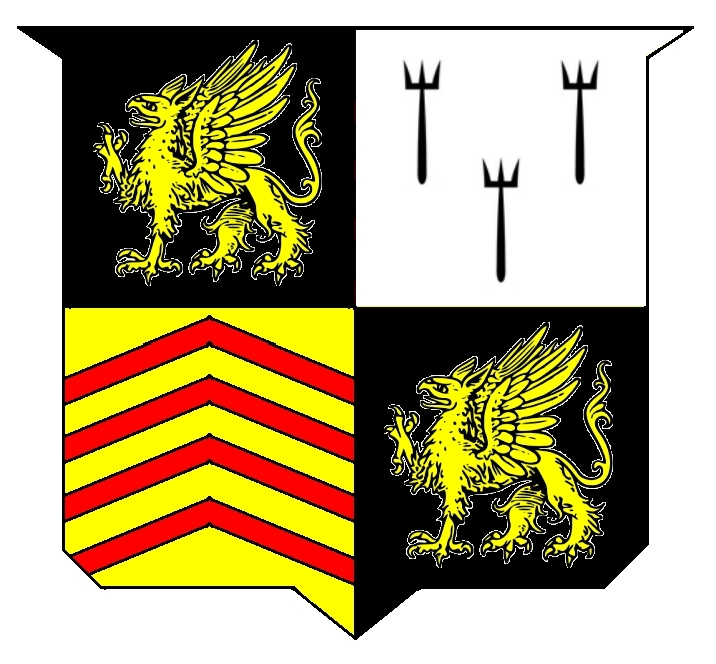
The Brice coat of arms, quartered Brice 1 and 4, Worthington and Every 2 and 3

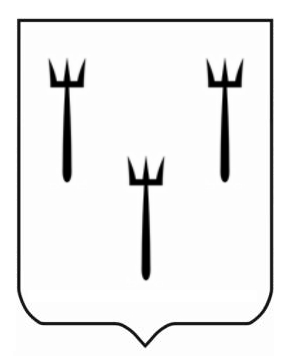
Worthington of Worthington Hall

Through Joan Every and Dorothy Worthington, both heraldic heiresses in their issue, certain Brice descendants may also quarter their arms with those of Worthington and Every.

== Notable Members ==
- John Brice (1320–1346), died at the Battle of Crecy
- William Brice (1338–1379), fought at the Battle of Poitiers
- Robert Bryce, reeve of Glastonbury in 1447
- Sir Hugh Brice, Mayor of London 1485–1486
- William Brice, reeve of Longbridge Deverill 1536–1537
- Hugh Brice, married Elizabeth Spencer, received a grant of arms in 1573
- Hugh Brice, his son, married Dorothy Worthington of Worthington Hall, Lancashire
- Worthington Brice, his son, married Joan Every of Wycroft Castle, Devon
- Worthington Brice, fined during the interregnum for entering the Kings Chamber during the English Civil War.
- John Brice, his son, fined during the interregnum for fighting as a Cavalier during the English Civil War.
