= Listed buildings in Worthington, Greater Manchester =

Worthington is a civil parish in the Metropolitan Borough of Wigan, Greater Manchester, England. It contains three listed buildings that are recorded in the National Heritage List for England. Of these, two are listed at Grade II*, the middle grade, and the other is at Grade II, the lowest grade. The parish is rural with no significant settlement, and the listed buildings are all houses.

== Key ==
Grade	Criteria
II*	Particularly important buildings of more than special interest
II	Buildings of national importance and special interest

== Buildings ==
Name and location	Photograph	Date	Notes	Grade
Worthington Hall; 53.58685°N 2.63760°W	—	1577	A farmhouse in stone, partly rendered, with some exposed timber framing and a slate roof. There are two storeys with attics, and four irregular bays. The second bay is timber framed, the upper floor is jettied, and the bressumer has decorative carving. There is a gabled porch with a Tudor arched opening, enriched spandrels, and an inscribed and dated lintel. The windows are casements, some with segmental heads, and at the rear are quoins.	II*
Manor House; 53.58685°N 2.63760°W		17th century (or earlier)	The house was later altered and extended. It is partly in stone and partly in brick, and has a roof partly in slate and partly in stone-slate. There are two storeys and five bays, the fourth and fifth bays projecting, gabled, and containing an attic. The windows in the first three bays are casements and in the other bays they are mullioned with hood moulds. Inside the house is a partly exposed cruck truss, an inglenook and a bressumer.	II*
Mill Bridge Farmhouse; 53.60748°N 2.63528°W	—	1694	A brick farmhouse on a stone plinth, with stone dressings, a brick band, and a slate roof. There are two storeys and three bays, the right bay gabled. On the front is a gabled porch with a segmental-arched opening, double doors inside, and a datestone above. In the right return are blocked three-light mullioned windows.	II
