= Worthington Hall, Wigan =

Listed building in Greater Manchester, England

Worthington Hall
- Worthington Hall c. 1900

- Location within Greater Manchester

General information
- Location: Worthington, Greater Manchester, England
- Coordinates: 53.5939°N 2.63452°W
- Completed: 1577

Design and construction
- Designations

Listed Building – Grade II*
- Official name: Worthington Hall
- Designated: 19 November 1951
- Reference no.: 1228585

Worthington Hall is an Elizabethan farm house on Chorley Road in Worthington, Metropolitan Borough of Wigan, Greater Manchester, England.

== History ==
An inscription on a lintel in the gabled porch dates the building to 1577.

The house is recorded in the National Heritage List for England as a designated Grade II* listed building, first listed on 19 November 1951.

== Architecture ==
The building is constructed in stone, partially rendered, with sections of exposed timber framing and a slate roof. It comprises two storeys with attics and features four irregular bays. The second bay is timber-framed, with a jettied upper floor supported by a carved bressumer. A gabled porch with a Tudor-arched entrance includes enriched spandrels and a lintel bearing an inscription and date. The windows are casement-style, some with segmental heads, and the rear elevation includes stone quoins.

== See also ==
- Grade II* listed buildings in Greater Manchester
- Listed buildings in Worthington, Greater Manchester
