= Avery Company =

American farm tractor manufacturer

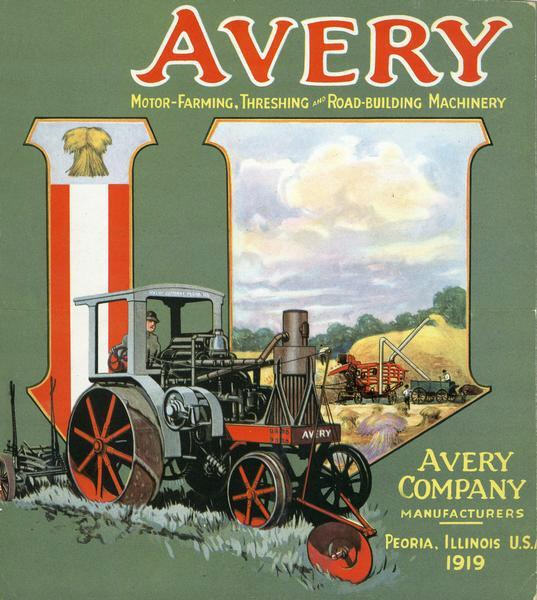
- Type: Private company
- Industry: Automotive
- Founded: 1891; 135 years ago
- Founder: Robert Hanneman Avery
- Defunct: 1928; 98 years ago
- Headquarters: Galesburg, Illinois, U.S.
- Area served: United States, Europe
- Products: Steam tractors, trucks, automobiles

The Avery Company, founded by Robert Hanneman Avery, was an American farm tractor manufacturer famed for its undermounted engine which resembled a railroad steam engine. Avery founded the farm implement business after the Civil War. His company built a large line of products, including steam engines, beginning in 1891. The company started with a return flue design and later adapted the undermount style, including a bulldog design on the smokebox door. Their design was well received by farmers in central Illinois. They expanded their market nationwide and overseas until the 1920s, when they failed to innovate and the company faltered. They manufactured trucks for a period of time, and then automobiles, until they finally succumbed to an agricultural crisis and the Depression.

== Origins in Civil War prison camp ==
Robert Hanneman Avery (16 January 1840, Galesburg, Illinois - 13 September 1892, Peoria, Illinois) was heavily influenced during his childhood by his great-uncle Riley Root, who invented a rotary fan blower to clear railroad tracks of snow. Robert attended Knox College and after graduation, worked part-time at the Brown Manufacturing Company, which built a line of corn planters.

Robert taught school before enlisting in 1862 as a Union Soldier in the American Civil War, in Company A, 77th Illinois Volunteer Infantry Regiment. He was captured in 1864 and spent a number of months in various prisoner-of-war camps, before being sent to the now infamous Confederate Andersonville Prison for about eight months. There he passed the time devising an improved seed drill by sketching a design in the sand.

After the war he worked on a 160-acre (0.65 km^{2}) farm his brother John had bought for the two of them. Robert continued to work on several inventions, and, during the winters when the farm was idle, he worked in a Galesburg, Illinois, machine shop. He used that money and the experience to design and develop patterns and castings for a riding cultivator.

=== Company founded by brothers ===
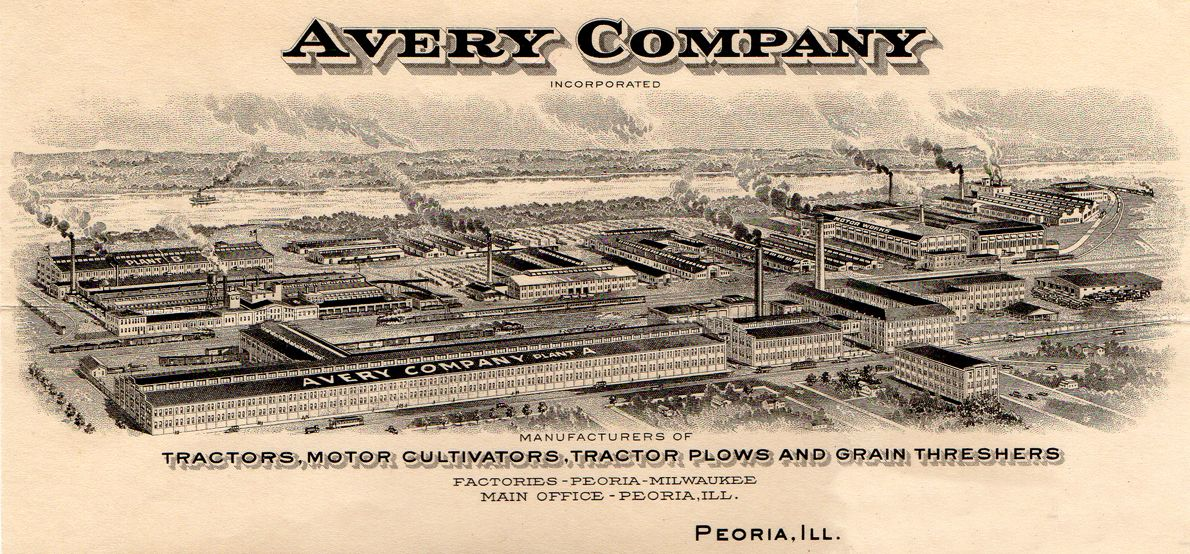
Bird's Eye view of Avery Company, Peoria, IL

Robert's brother Cyrus Avery thought the invention had huge potential. To fund their company, Cyrus invested some capital, and Robert sold his share of the farm to his brother John and borrowed additional money. They began business as R.H. & C.M. Avery Company. Sales did not take off and the brothers' company teetered on bankruptcy. Robert moved his family to Kansas and took advantage of the Homestead Act of 1862 to obtain more farm land. He invented a new spiral corn stalk cutter and this time sales increased quickly. In 1872, Robert moved back to Galesburg and with his brother Cyrus' help, restarted the Avery Company. By 1874 he had a full size working model of his corn planter built. The original planter is now in the Edison Institute Museum at Ford's Greenfield Village in Dearborn, Michigan.

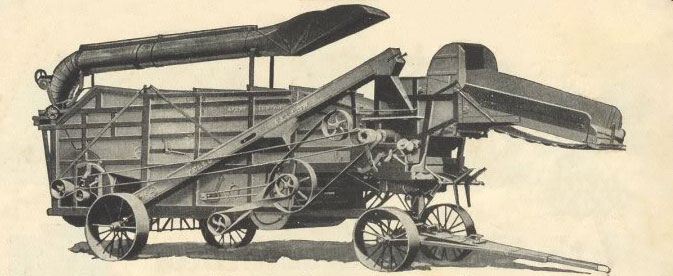
Avery Thresher

One of their inventions was the Avery Thresher, a popular threshing machine in the late 19th century and early 20th century. The thresher was driven from the flywheel of a steam traction engine. A belt from the flywheel drove a wheel found on the thresher, separating the wheat kernels from the wheat stalks.

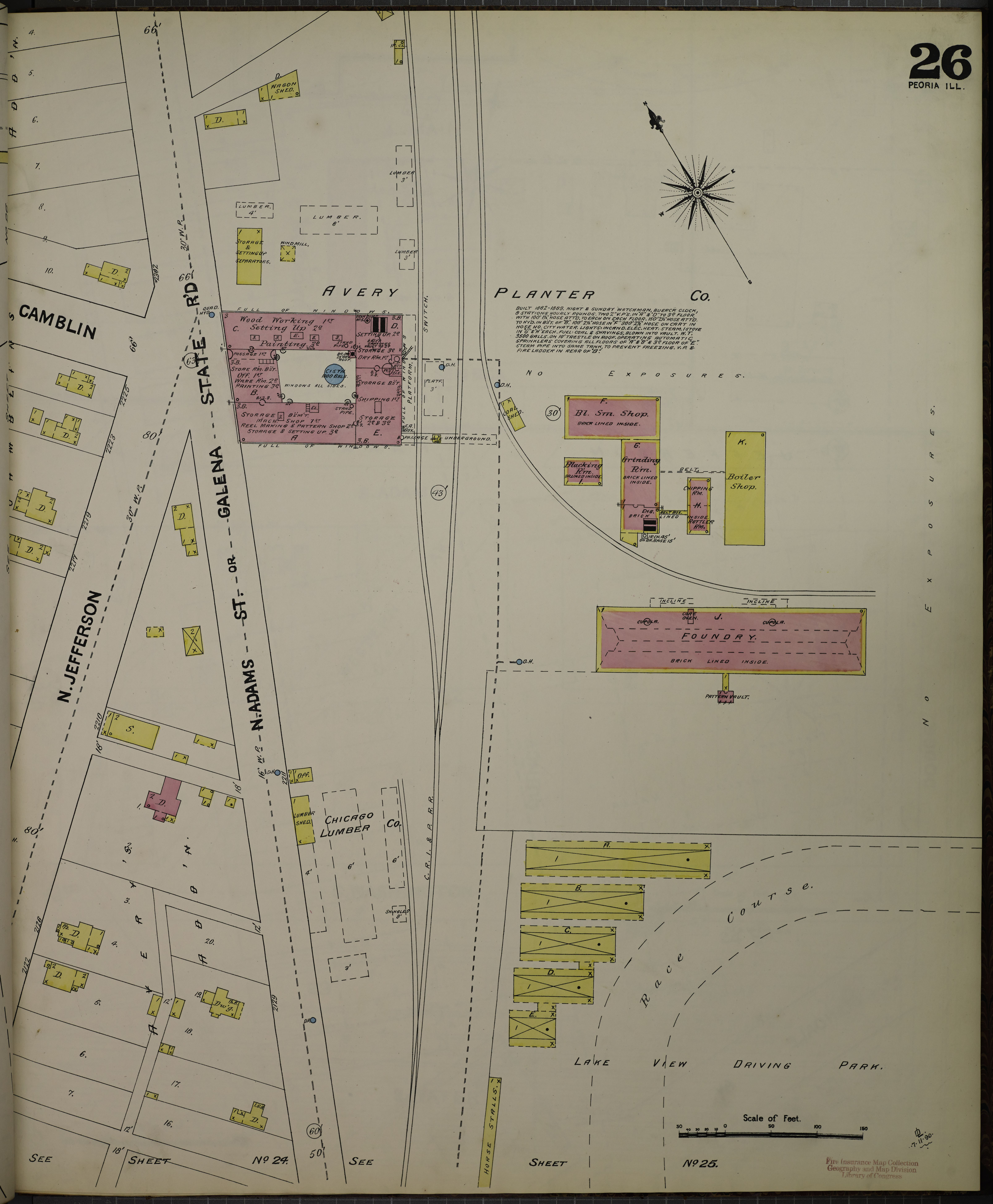
Avery Planter Company, Peoria, IL

Robert was the inventor while Cyrus managed the business aspects. They operated out of Galesburg, Illinois, until 1882, when they needed better access to railroad transportation and wider markets. They bought into the oldest foundry in Peoria, owned by Joseph Frost. They then purchased 18 acres (73,000 m^{2}) in Peoria, Illinois, and moved the business there to North Adams and North Jefferson Streets adjacent to a railroad spur. They built a three-story manufacturing facility, producing check rowers, stalk cutters, corn planters, cultivators and hand tools. In 1883 the company was capitalized at US$200.000 and renamed the Avery Planter Company.

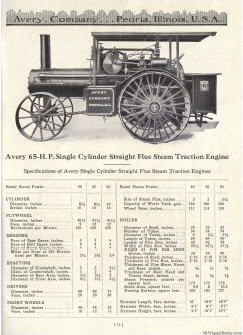
Page from the Avery Company catalog describing their "65hp Single Cylinder Straight Flue Steam Traction Engine"

When they began manufacturing powered tractors, they hired Albert Espe, one of the premier tractor designers in the country. In 1899, the company was reincorporated, the capital stock increased to US$600,000, and it was renamed the Avery Manufacturing Company. In 1891, they enlarged their product line to include steam traction engines and grain threshers, which would become up the majority of their business for the next 30 years. Their tractors used the best steam engines of the day, and the boilers were reinforced to withstand extra pressure. The line included unique tractors with top-mounted steam engines resembling locomotives more than typical farm tractors of the day. One of their yellow wood threshers were nicknamed the Yellow Fellow and remained a large part of the company's business for the next thirty years. Avery made a variety steam engines, including 18 horsepower (13 kW) 30 horsepower (22 kW), 40 horsepower (30 kW), 50 horsepower (37 kW) and 65 horsepower (48 kW) hp models. They also made Corn King and Corn Queen cultivators, separators, wagons, horse stalk cutters and a steel-mounted water tank.

In 1892, Robert died and Cyrus became president. John B. Bartholomew, who started with the company on December 8, 1879, driving a team to haul lumber for a US$1.10 per day, was made vice-president. He was also the brother of Cyrus' wife, Minnie.

Avery Steam Tractors
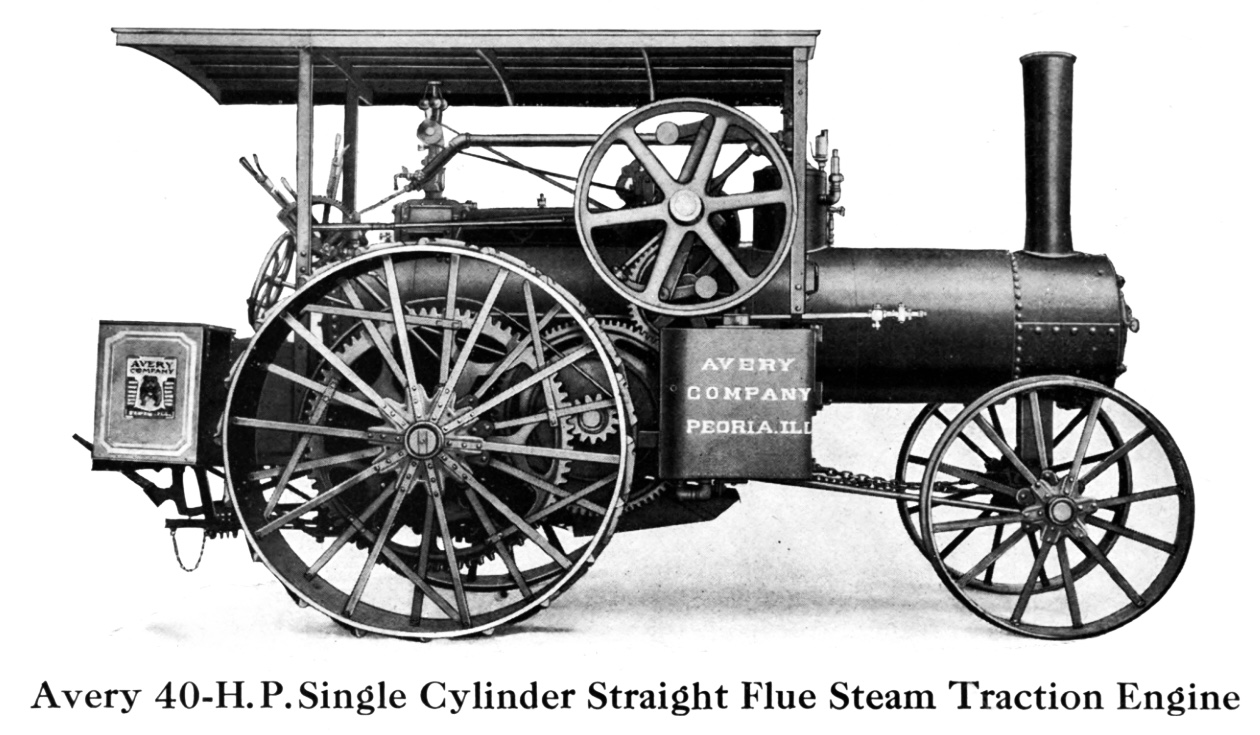
one cylinder,8760 cc, 40 hp, 530 liter water tank

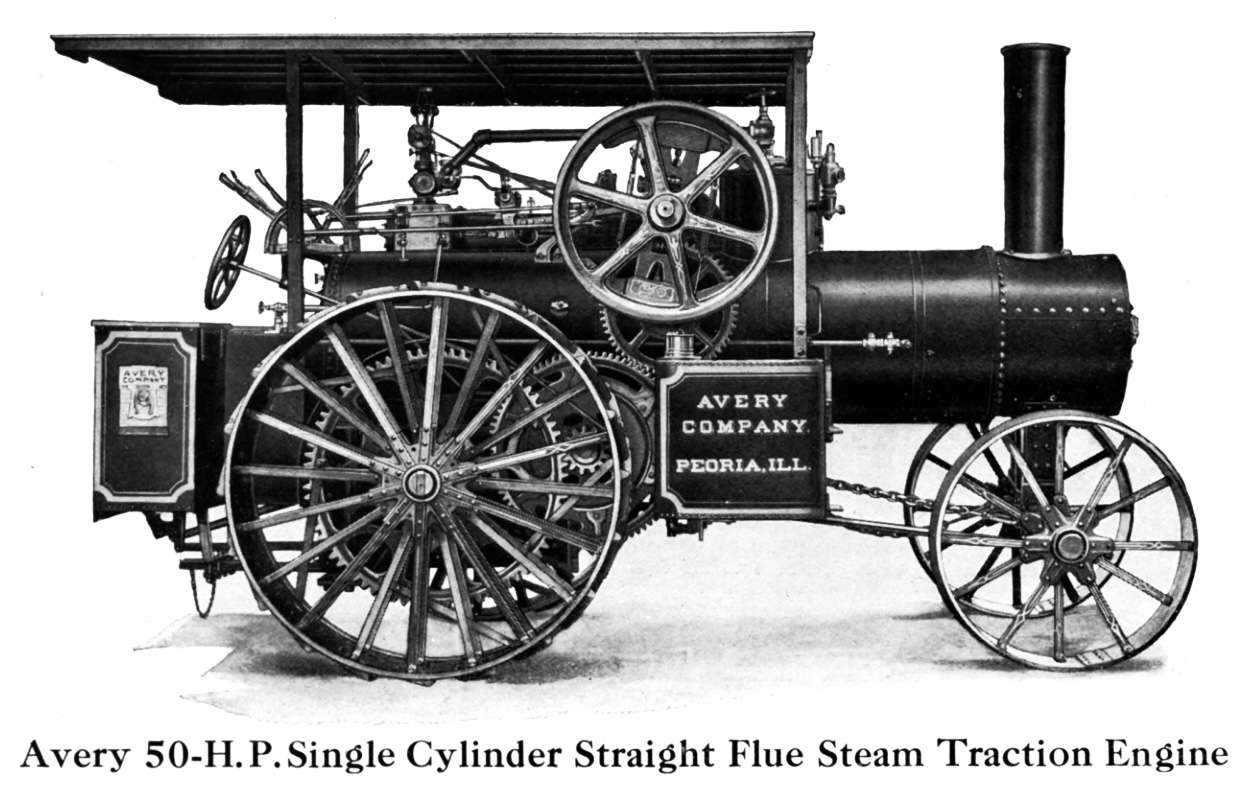
one cylinder,9854 cc, 50 hp, 680 liter water tank

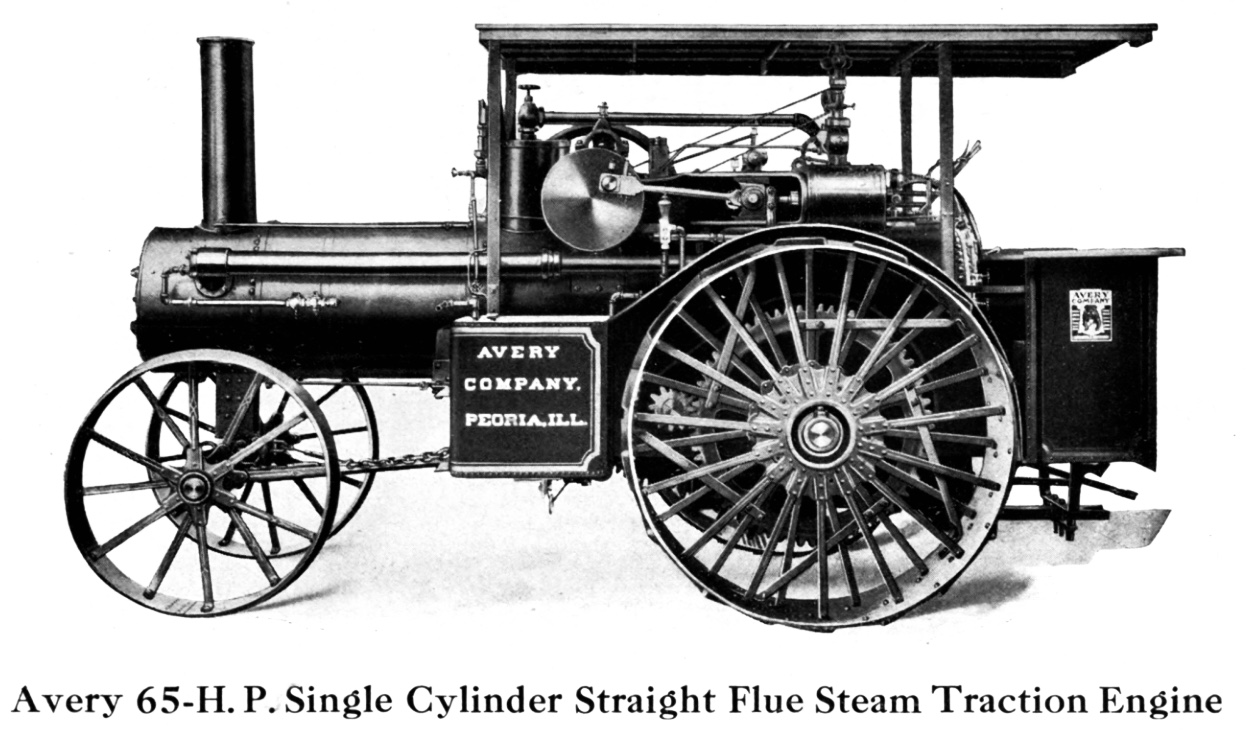
one cylinder,12870cc, 65 hp, 870 liter water tank

=== Reputation for innovation ===
In 1894, Avery introduced a mechanical corn picker which tractor expert Jack Norbeck described as 'so different and unusual that at the time farmers wouldn't buy it because it would put too many people out of work.' Avery also invented removable piston sleeves for its gas tractors starting in 1916. Other tractor manufacturers eventually adopted the same practice. It also offered the first farm toy ever manufactured as a favor: they gave away miniature Avery tractors, 3 inches (76 mm) high and of cast iron, made by Hubley.

== Capitalization growth ==
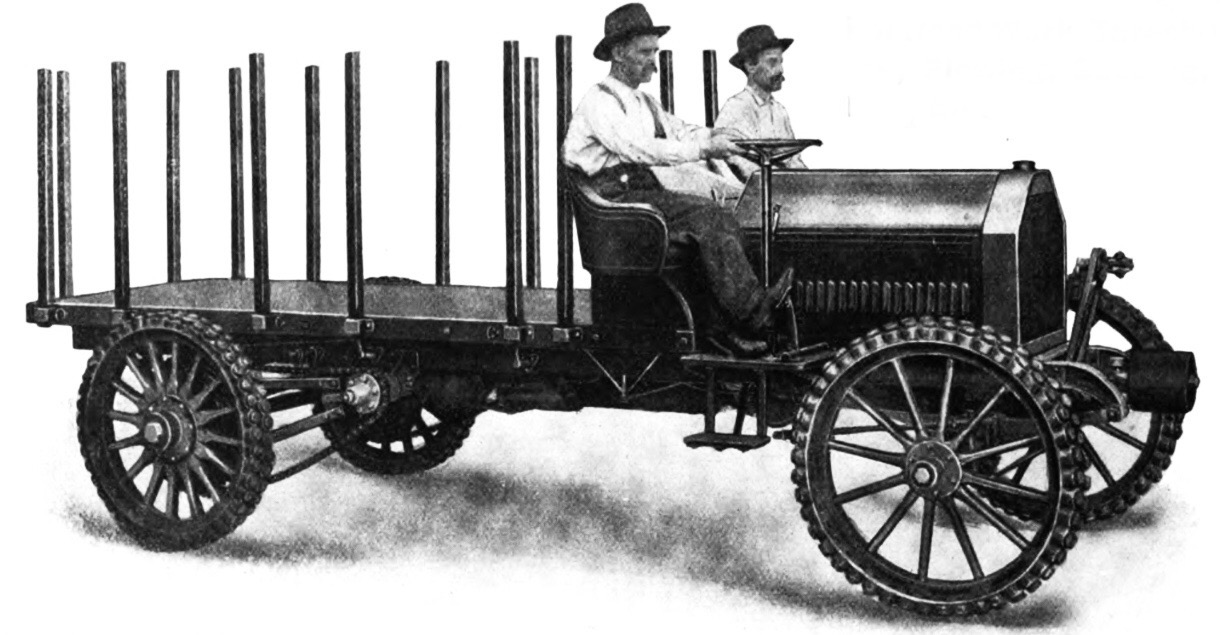
Avery Farm & City 36 hp (1909-1914)

In 1900 the company's stock was valued at US$1,000.000. In 1902, Avery purchased the Hannah Wagon Co., and it continued to grow until 1912 when it was valued at US$2,500,000. Cyrus Avery left active management of the company in 1902 and built a new home in Galesburg. In September, 1905, Cyrus M. Avery died. His son, George Luzerne Avery, had served as his father' secretary and was made a director of the company upon his father's death. George's uncle, J. B. Bartholomew, became president.

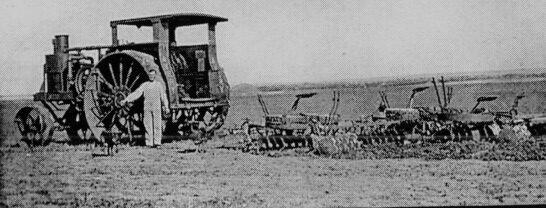
An Avery tractor pulling three sod cutters on a farm near Larned, Kansas, around 1916

The Avery company made many traction engines, such as the 1907 steam tractor model. At that time steam was the only form of power and the tractor resembled a miniature locomotive. In 1909, Avery began manufacturing gasoline tractors. They shortly gained a reputation for producing huge tractors, including the very large for its day 40 horsepower (30 kW) Avery steam traction engines, weighing 25 short tons (23 t) each. Large tractors were needed across the prairie from North Dakota to Texas to turn the virgin sod, often with roots as thick as a man's thumb, into tillable soil. Even teams of 16 horses were not strong enough to pull gang plows through the dense bunch grasses whose roots grew as deep as 6 feet (1.8 m) into the earth. The first small steam traction engines, adapted from the design of stationary engines used to thresh wheat and gin cotton, weren't strong enough and broke down repeatedly.

The competitive landscape changed during that same year, 1909, when the Holt Manufacturing Company of Stockton, California, arrived in Peoria. Holt, a builder of steam-powered harvesters and traction engines and already a leader in crawler tractors, purchased the bankrupt Colean Manufacturing Company, which had manufactured farm implements and steam traction engines across town. Holt established their eastern manufacturing branch there, under the name Holt Caterpillar Company—the predecessor to Caterpillar Inc. In the same year, Avery's first tractor was a huge 60 horsepower (45 kW) model with a 12- by 18-inch bore and stroke. The competition included the 15-30 Model O Quincy tractor, made in 1911; the Fairbanks-Morse 15-25 of the same year and the 20-hp International Harvester Company Mogul of 1909. Unfortunately, their first tractor failed to perform, and they pulled it from the 1910 Winnipeg Tractor Demonstration.

== Broad line of products manufactured ==
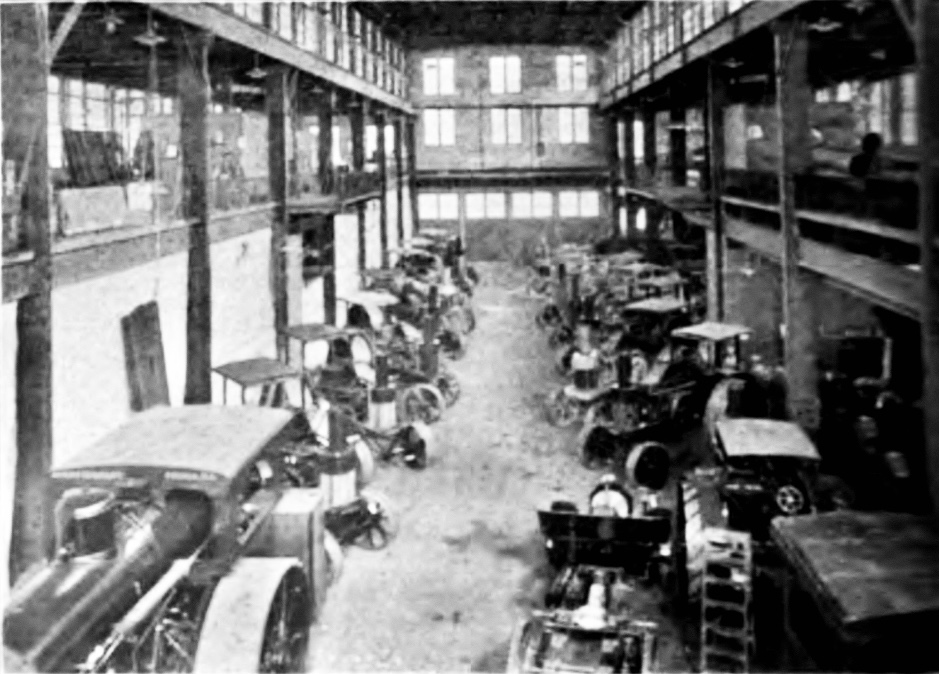
Avery Paint Shop with one week production (1912)

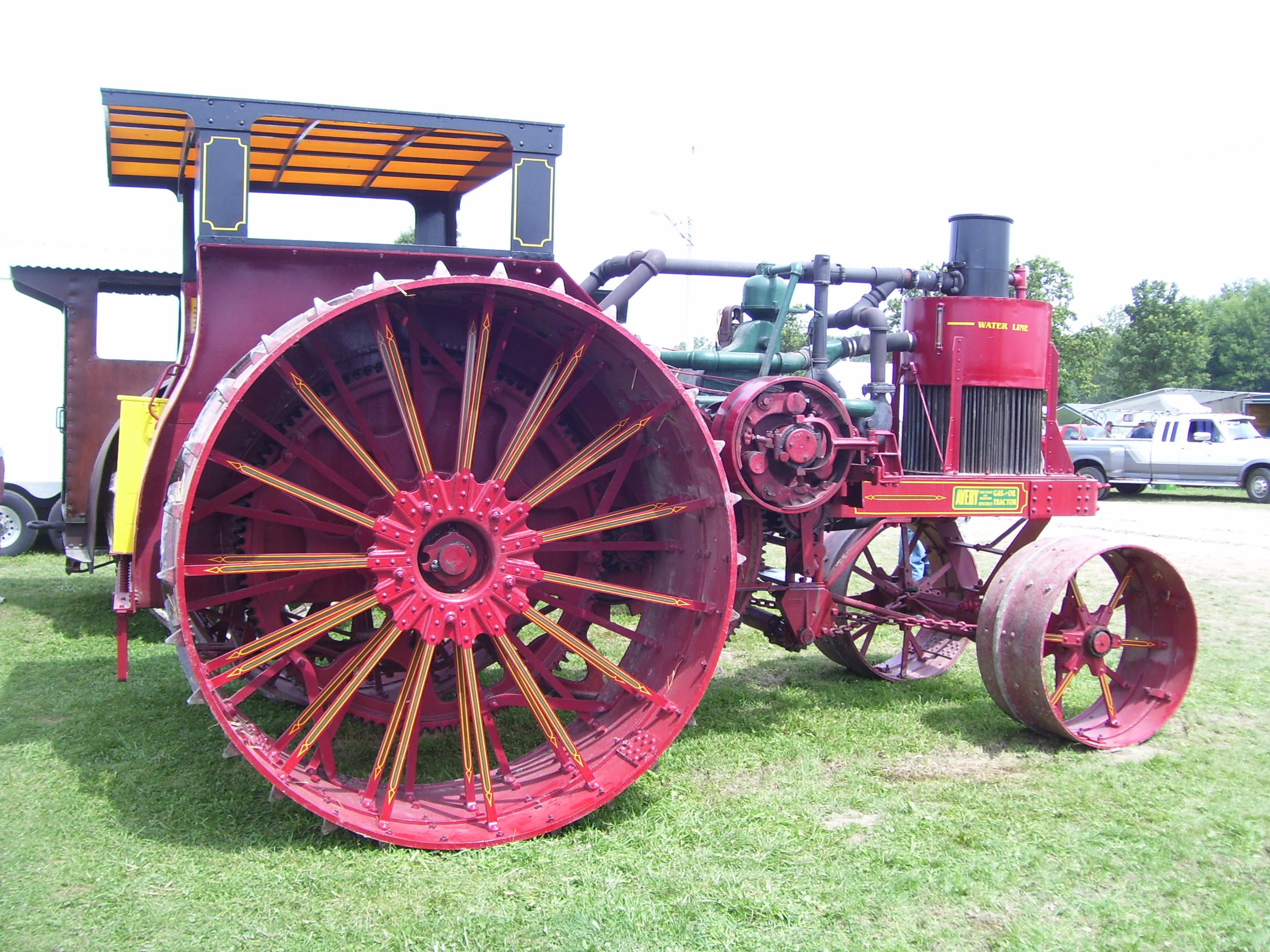
Avery 40 horsepower (30 kW) (drawbar)-80 horsepower (60 kW) (belt pully) horsepower tractor

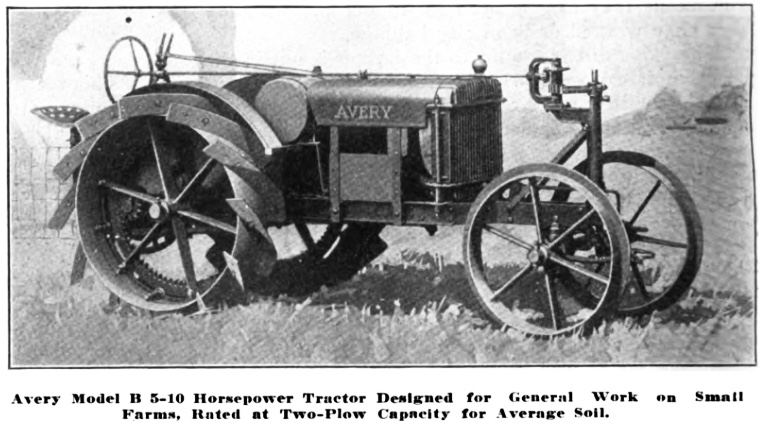
Avery Model B 5-10 (1919-1922)

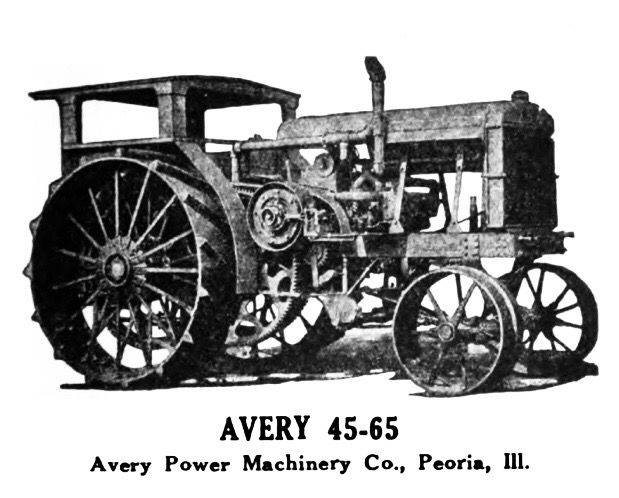
Avery 45-65

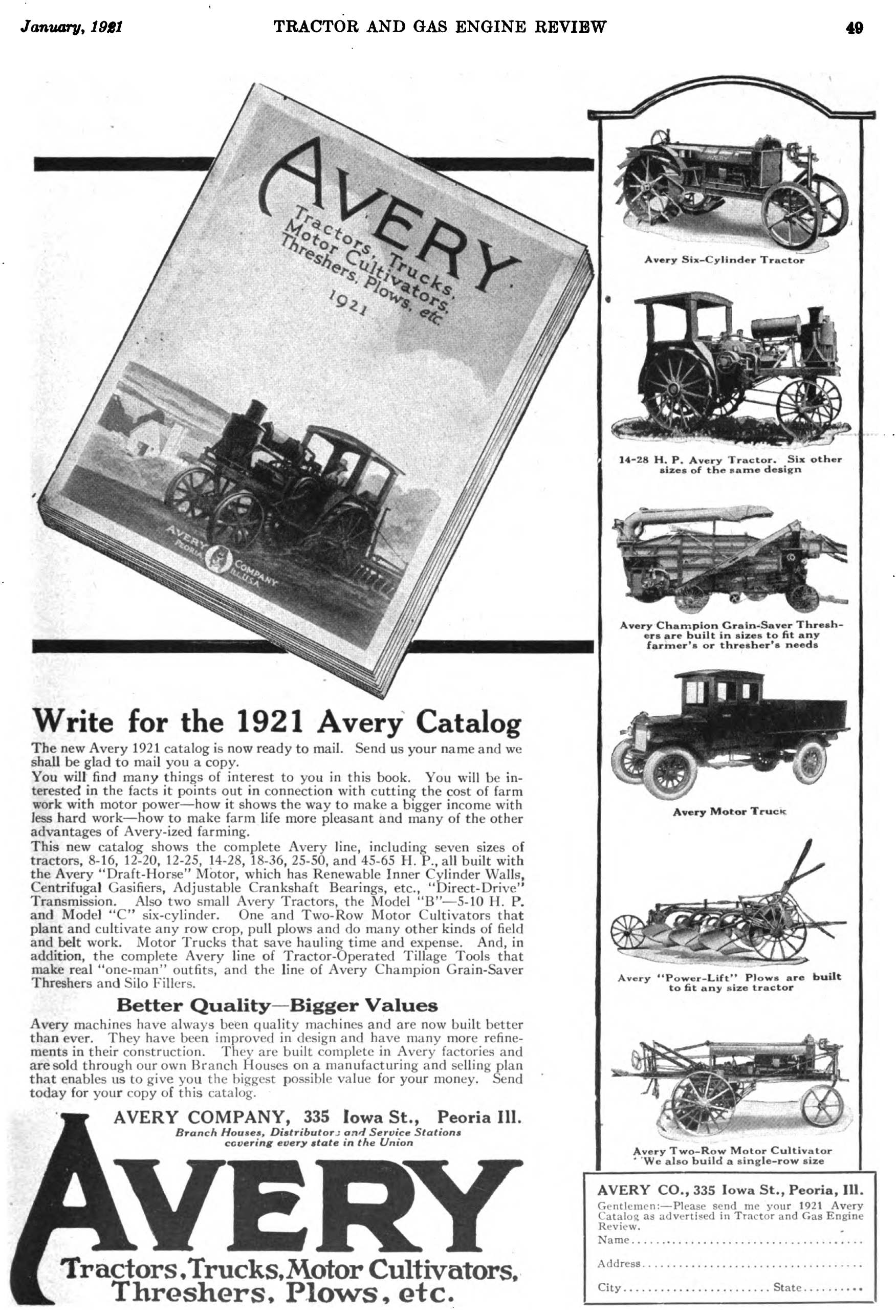
An advertisement for the Avery Company in Tractor and Gas Engine Review, January 1921. Its product line for 1921 included tractors, trucks, threshers, plows, motor cultivators, and other implements.

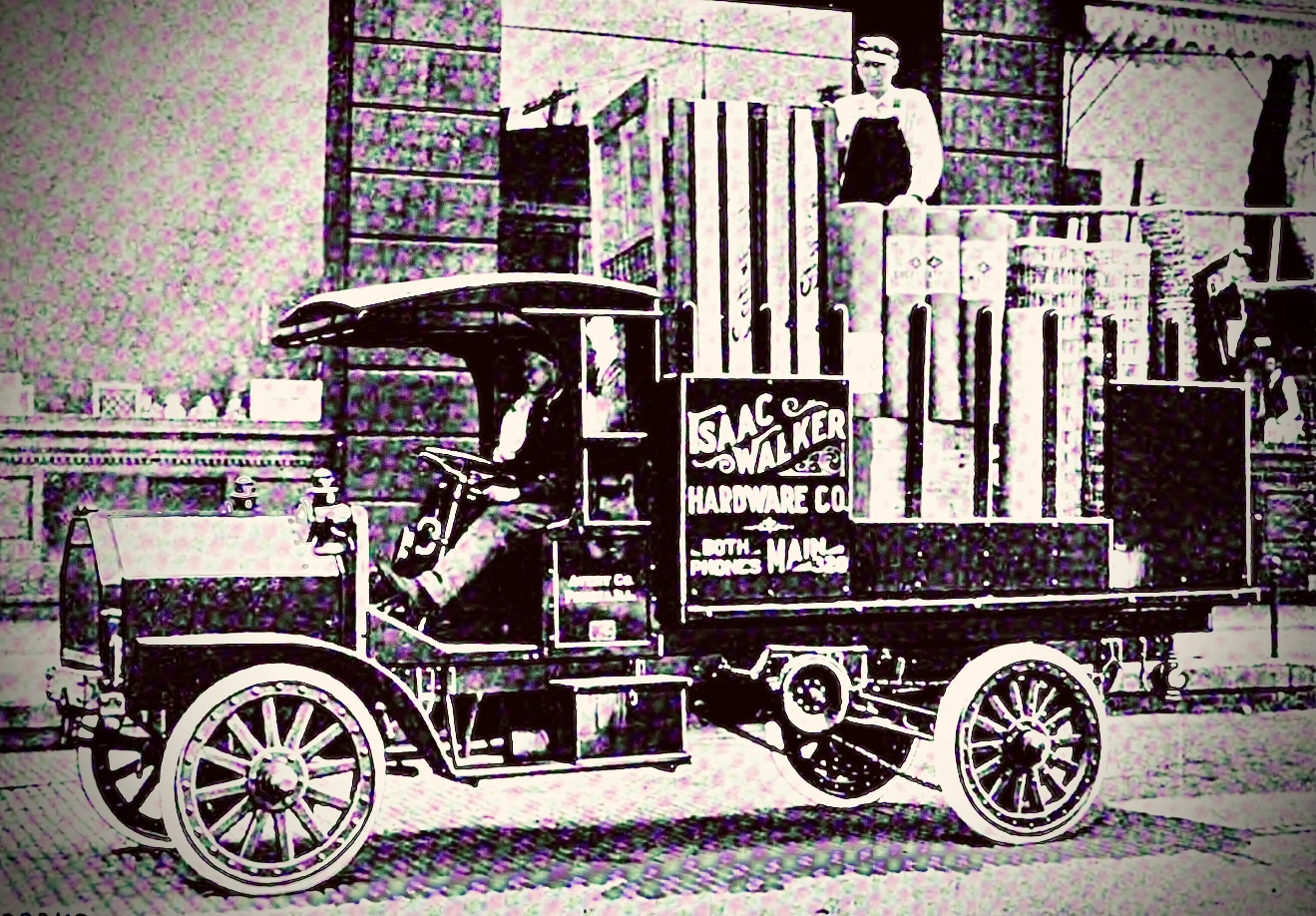
Avery truck (1914)

In 1912, the entire Avery Company plant covered more than twenty-seven acres. The company, progressive for its time, established a dispensary on site that was staffed five hours each day by two doctors. It also started its own insurance company about the same time. The main factory building and the associated warehouses covered another six and a half acres. The sections of the plant were joined by a company-designed trolley system used to transport parts. At the time, it manufactured steam and gasoline traction engines, mounted steel water tanks, self-lift plows, farm wagons, corn planters, traction hauling wagons, traction steam shovels, threshing machinery and all required attachments, riding and walking cultivators, single and double row stalk cutters and gasoline tractors. At its height, it called itself "The Largest Tractor Company in the World" and employed 2,600 men, manufacturing eight different tractors along with motor cultivators and trucks. The company offered a broad line of tractors and engines, ranging from one–row cultivator to a huge 80 horsepower (60 kW) tractor.

Avery Tractors
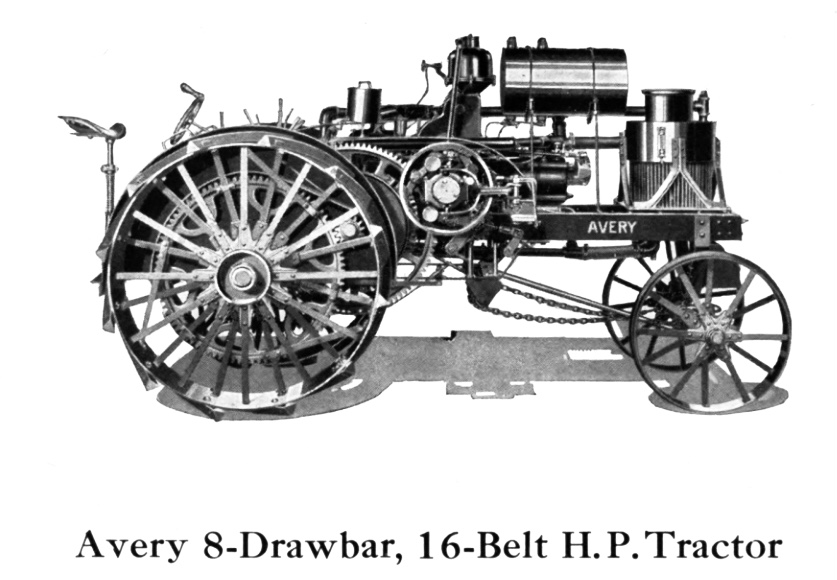
two cylinder,4672 cc, 8-16 hp

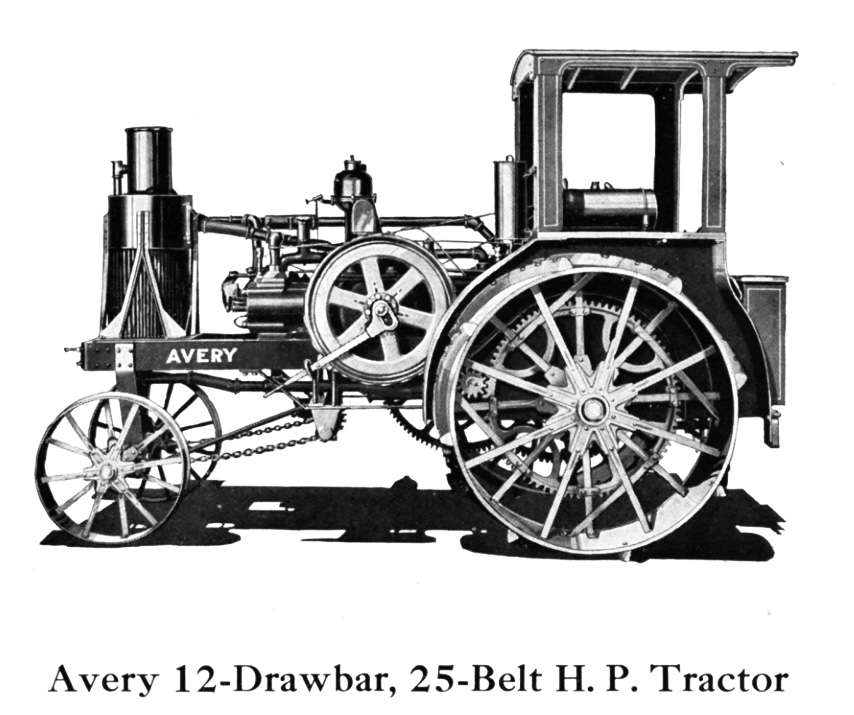
two cylinder,7613 cc, 12-25 hp

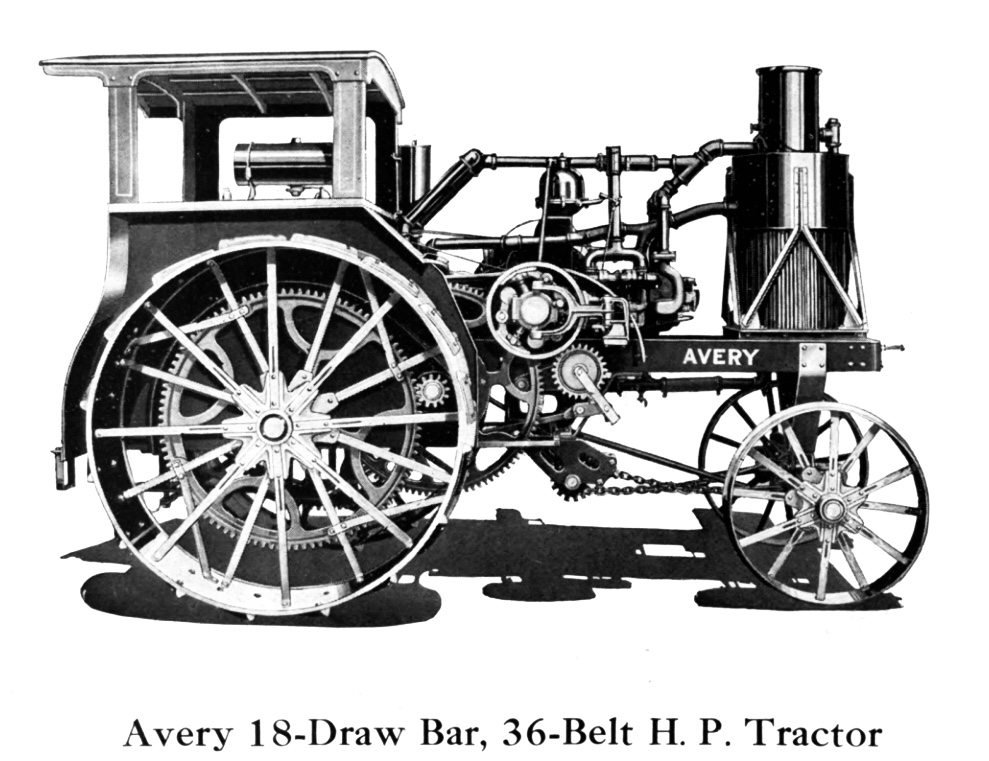
four cylinder,9344 cc, 18-36 hp

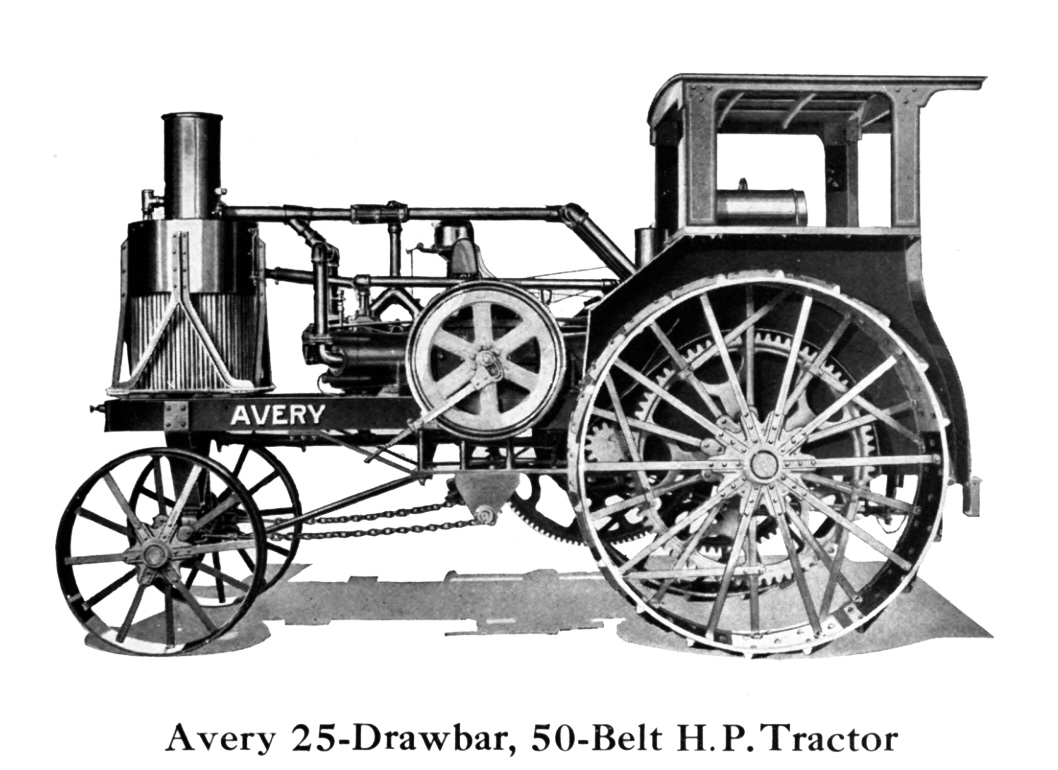
four cylinder,15226 cc, 25-50 hp

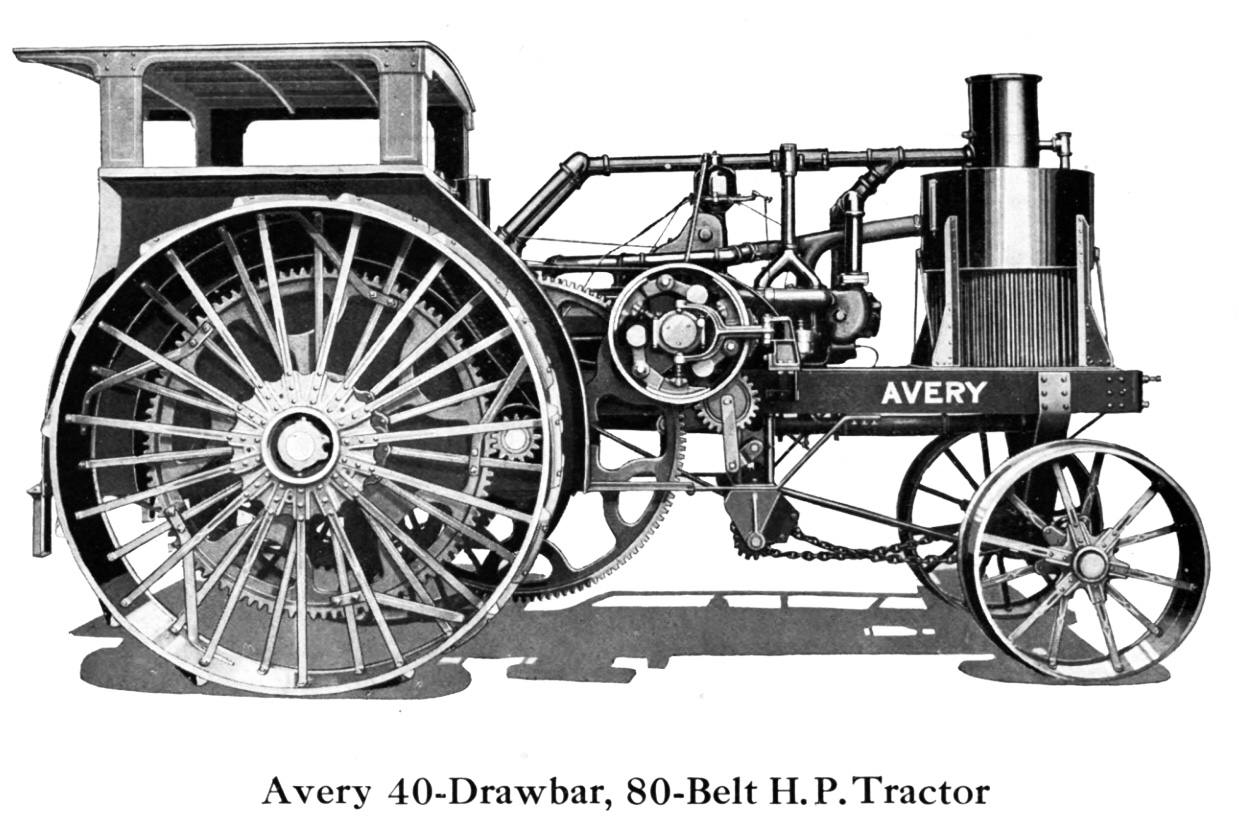
four cylinder,24737 cc, 40-80 hp

=== Truck manufacturing ===
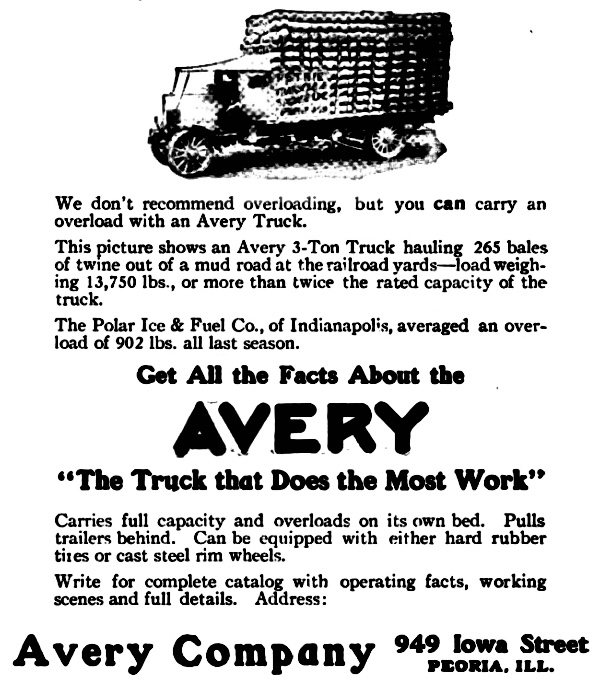
Avery advertisement (1912)

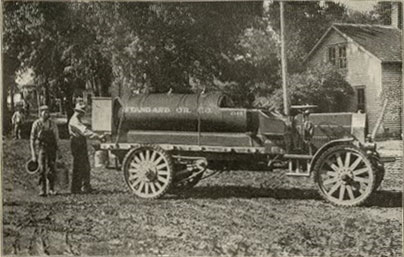
Avery truck with cast steel rim wheels used by Standard Oil Company, c. 1917

Avery started building agricultural trucks in 1910. Early truck manufacturers were uncertain how to market their product and whether they should just be used to haul goods or should also be useful in the field. Avery described its truck as a 'gasoline farm wagon' and 'general farm power machine' for city, town, and country hauling. Their advertising suggested the farmer could use it to haul livestock, grain, hay, and other loads, as to pull plows, road graders, harrows, discs, binders, and other farm machinery, as well as loaded wagons. The truck weighed 1 short ton (0.91 t) and featured a four-cylinder engine, open cab and chain drive. Its wheels had wooden spokes and rims, while the steel tires were 1.5 inches (38 mm)x5 inches (130 mm) wide. Avery figured farmers could get the most use out of the machines during the harvest season. Their tractor trucks included a large belt pulley that could be attached to the front crank shaft, useful for powering grain separators and other belt-driven machines. Early models had cast steel wheels with holes. Wooden plugs were driven into the holes to provide added traction. When the wooden plugs wore down, the owner simply replaced them with new wooden plugs.

Avery shipped products to most of the United States and some foreign countries. They opened branch offices in Omaha, Nebraska; Des Moines, Iowa; Kansas City, Missouri; Minneapolis, Minnesota; St. Louis, Missouri, Indianapolis, Indiana; Grand Forks, North Dakota; Fargo, North Dakota, Aberdeen, South Dakota; and Winnipeg, Canada. They had customers in Mexico, Argentina, Brazil, Russia, what was then Austria-Hungary, the Philippines, Portugal, China, Sweden, Cuba and Egypt.

In 1912, Avery added 2 short tons (1.8 t) and 3 short tons (2.7 t) trucks with solid rubber tires. Closed cabs were added a year later, and in 1917 they introduced a cab-over-engine design featuring an enclosed chain drive. The style of Avery trucks became more conventional, but the new six-cylinder model introduced in 1921 didn't last long because within five years the company was bankrupt.

=== Track-type tractors gain favor ===
They introduced a locomotive style, double-under mounted steam traction engine to the market. However, by this time track-type tractors and a combination combine-harvester were becoming more popular over the large steel tire wheel tractor and the stationary threshing machine. Continuing to grow, the company in 1916 purchased a former plant of the Kingman Plow Co., and in 1917 they acquired the Davis Manufacturing Co. engine plant in Milwaukee, Wisconsin, enabling Avery to build its own engines. J. B. Bartholomew had for several years been President of the Bartholomew Company, which manufactured Glide automobiles in Peoria Heights. In 1920 he decided to bring the plant into the Avery Co. fold and it was utilized to manufacture trucks. Avery employed four thousand people by this point. When the agricultural depression of the early 1920s struck, Avery's varied product offerings were expensive, and when farmers defaulted on their notes held by Avery dealers, the company's liberal credit policy badly hurt its finances. Farmers also showed increasing preference for track-type farm implements, and Avery failed to innovate with new products. They built one track-type tractor named the "Trackrunner," but were unsuccessful at perfecting it. Some machinery sold did not work as advertised, and Avery failed to fix the problems. Avery cut its work force in August 1920 by 90 per cent, to 250 workers. They replaced the tubular radiator style with an improved tubular cellular design, but it was not enough.

== Bankruptcy and receivership ==
Lacking research and design resources and unable to manufacture competitive products, the company entered bankruptcy and went into receivership in 1923. One year later President J. B. Bartholomew died. Former officers of the bankrupt Avery company organized a new, smaller firm in late 1925 as the Avery Power Machinery Co., acquiring a large portion of the original plant in Peoria. They developed and manufactured a new line of advanced all-steel threshers and combine harvesters employing anti-friction bearings. They also manufactured parts for all of the previous Avery machines, for which there was still considerable demand. The competition for track-type farm equipment increased in 1925 when the Holt Manufacturing Co. and the C. L. Best Co. of San Leandro, California, merged to form the Caterpillar Tractor Co. When wheat dropped to 25 cents a bushel in 1931, farmers could not afford new farm implements and the new Avery Power Machinery company could not pay its debts. Banks with an interest in the company placed a manager in charge in late 1931, who gradually liquidated the company's assets.

As the Depression waned, the company was restarted in 1936 as the Avery Farm Machinery Co. It primarily manufactured combines, separators, and replacement combine cylinder teeth. Two years later, in 1938, it produced the Avery Ro-Trac tractor, which had an unusual front-axle design that could be converted from a narrow- to a wide-front tractor. It was the first Avery tractor in a dozen years, but this was its last tractor. World War II interrupted production again, and the company closed its doors for the last time.

== Collector value ==
Avery tractors are considered very rare and are highly prized among collectors today. A large model 40-80 built from 1913 to 1920 in premier condition can fetch over $100,000 at auction.

== See also ==
- Traction engine
- Steam tractor
- Avery Thresher
