= Van Every =

Van Every is a surname. For a history of the surname, see the Van Watervliet family article. Notable people with the surname include:

- Dale Van Every (1896–1976), American writer and film producer
- Hal Van Every (1918–2007), American footballer
- Jonathan Van Every (born 1979), American baseball player
- Kermit Van Every (1915–1998), American aerospace engineer
- Peter Van Every (1795–1859), American politician
