= William C. Avery =

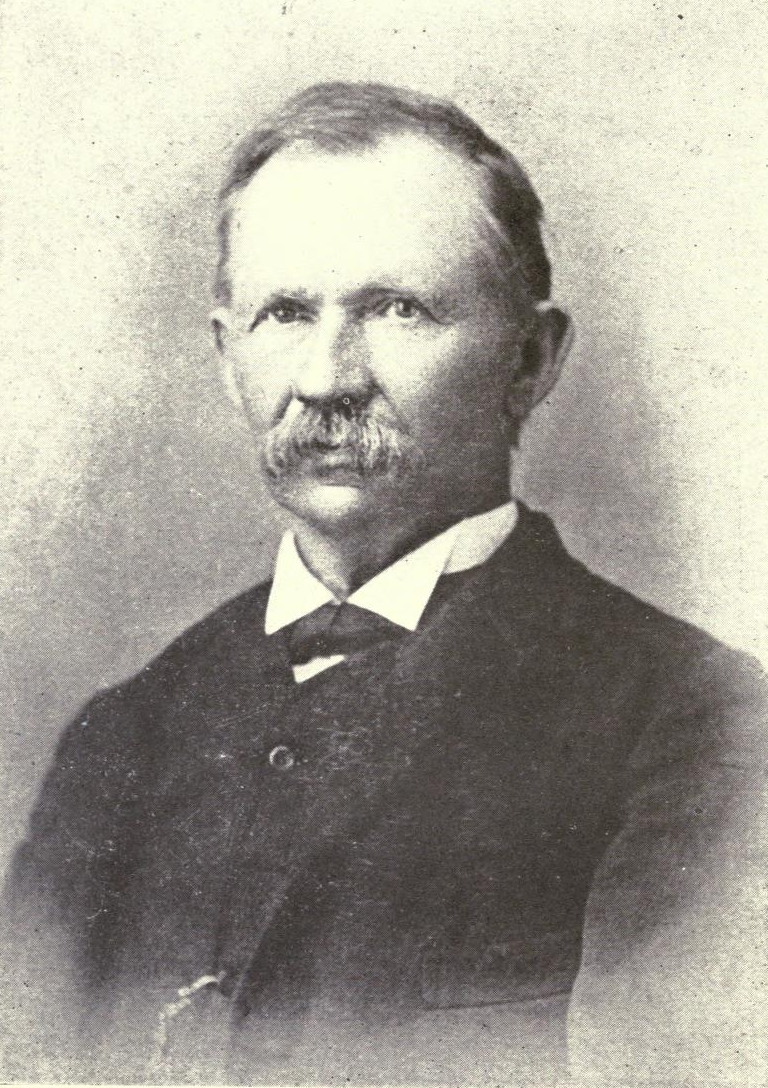

William Cushman Avery (21 September 1831 – 11 March 1894) was an American physician, naturalist and collector from Alabama. His collections of bird skins and eggs are held in the University of Alabama Vertebrate Zoology Collection.

== Life and work ==
Avery was born in Edenton, North Carolina, to Rev. John and Ann Paine. His paternal ancestors included William Avery who came from Berkshire in 1650, Robert Cushman and Isaac Allerton who came on the Mayflower in 1620 while Robert Treat Paine was a maternal ancestor. He was tutored at home by his mother before he went to Burlington College, NJ in 1851. After graduation, he taught at a school before taking up medical studies at the University of Pennsylvania. He also studied in Paris and travelled through Italy, Germany, Spain and Switzerland. He returned to live and practice in Marshall, Texas. He then moved to Greensboro, Alabama, closer to his mother. In 1861 he moved to Selma, Alabama and shortly after he enlisted as a Confederate private in Col. N.H.R. Dawson's regiment but fell sick with measles in Virginia. Shortly after a recovery the regiment moved to Dumfries in Virginia where he suffered from typhoid. He was discharged from the army and he returned to Greensboro. He practiced medicine and became involved in collecting bird specimens in 1875. He collected nearly 900 specimens which he skinned. He also collected small mammals. He went on collecting trips in Alabama, Dauphin Island, Perdido Bay, New York, North Carolina and Arizona. The collection was acquired by the Geological Survey of Alabama and catalogued by Ernest Golsan Holt. His specimens have been the source of information on the historical status of a number of birds and mammals.
