= Matthew Avery =

African American politician (b. 1834)

Matthew Avery (1834-?) was a state legislator in Alabama. An African American, he represented Perry County, Alabama in the Alabama House of Representatives.

He was born in North Carolina. He was a farmer and minister.

He was elected to the Alabama House of Representatives in 1868. Fellow African American Greene Lewis also represented Perry County in the state house. Thomas Steward, white, was the county's third representative.

He succeeded Thomas Lee who died.

== See also ==
- African American officeholders from the end of the Civil War until before 1900
