= Frances Avery =

American artist (1910–2006)

- Born: 1910; Kitchener, Ontario, Canada
- Died: 2006 (aged 95–96); New York City, United States
- Other names: Frances Avery Penney, Frances Penney Avery
- Occupations: Visual artist, photographer, teacher
- Spouse: James Penney

Frances Avery (1910 – 2006) was an American visual artist, photographer and teacher. She was known for her mural work for the Works Progress Administration, and later, for her photography.

She studied the craft of mural painting with Thomas Hart Benton at the Art Students League of New York. She also studied at the Workers School in New York City where she crossed paths with Diego Rivera. She created three murals for the Public Works of Art Project, that no longer exist. Avery also created a four-wall mural for the doctors' library of Lincoln Hospital in the Bronx. Avery went on to study photography with Berenice Abbott.

One of her photographs is in the collection of the Museum of Modern Art. She taught for many years at Adelphi University in Garden City, New York..
