= Worthington, Greater Manchester =

Civil parish in Greater Manchester, England

Coordinates: 53.587°N 2.636°W

Worthington
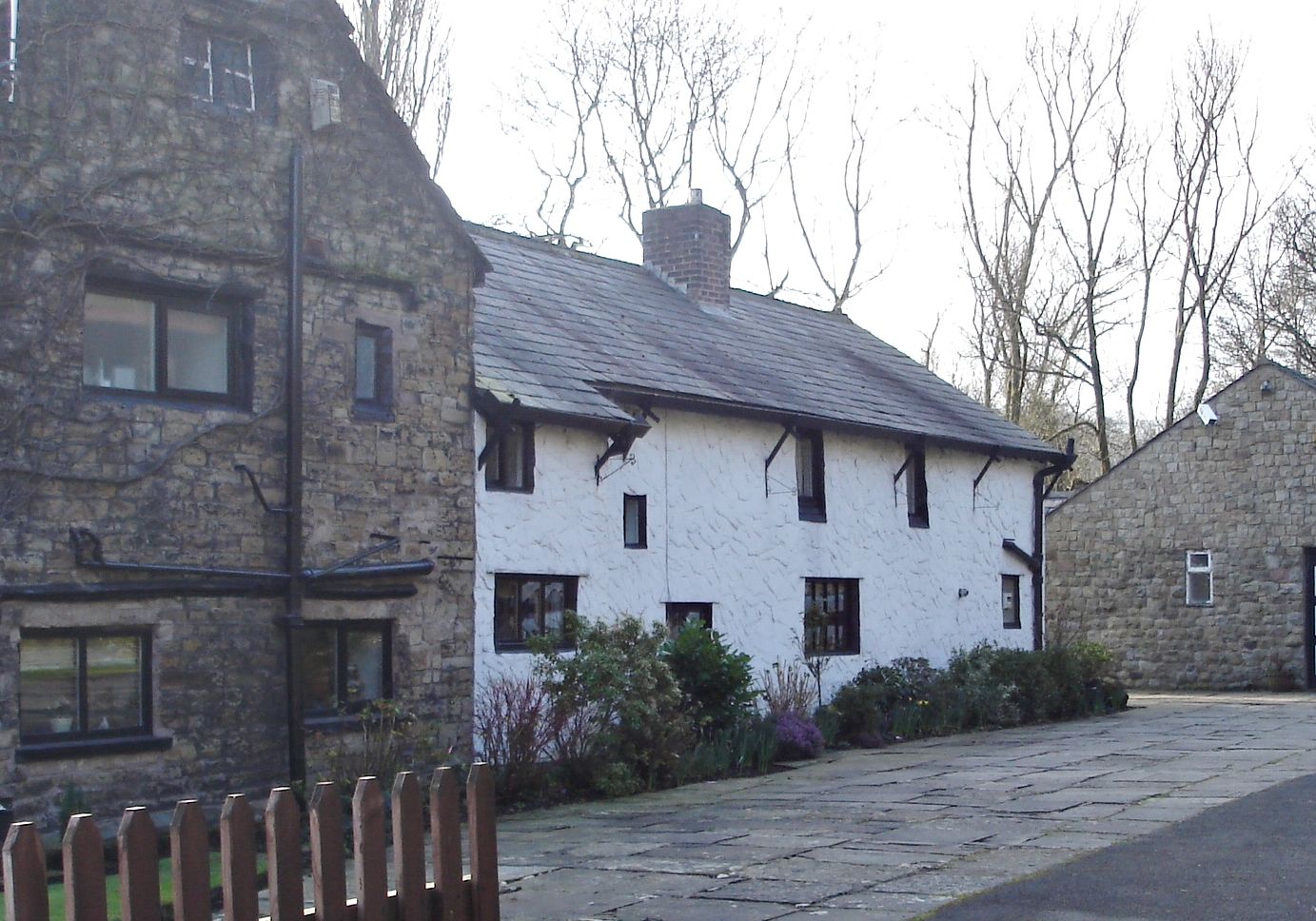
- Manor House in Worthington

- Location within Greater Manchester
- Population: 135 (2001)
- OS grid reference: SD579102
- Civil parish: Worthington
- Metropolitan borough: Metropolitan Borough of Wigan
- Metropolitan county: Greater Manchester
- Region: North West
- Country: England
- Sovereign state: United Kingdom
- Post town: WIGAN
- Postcode district: WN1
- Dialling code: 01257
- Police: Greater Manchester
- Fire: Greater Manchester
- Ambulance: North West
- UK Parliament: Wigan (UK Parliament constituency)

Worthington is a civil parish within the Metropolitan Borough of Wigan in Greater Manchester, England, located about four miles (6.4 km) north of Wigan. The parish is very sparsely populated, with a population of 135 at the 2001 census, and it does not have an active parish council or parish meeting.

It once had a dyeworks and a colliery. Its parish church is the Church of St Wilfrid. The parish is also home to two Grade II* listed buildings: Worthington Hall and Manor House.

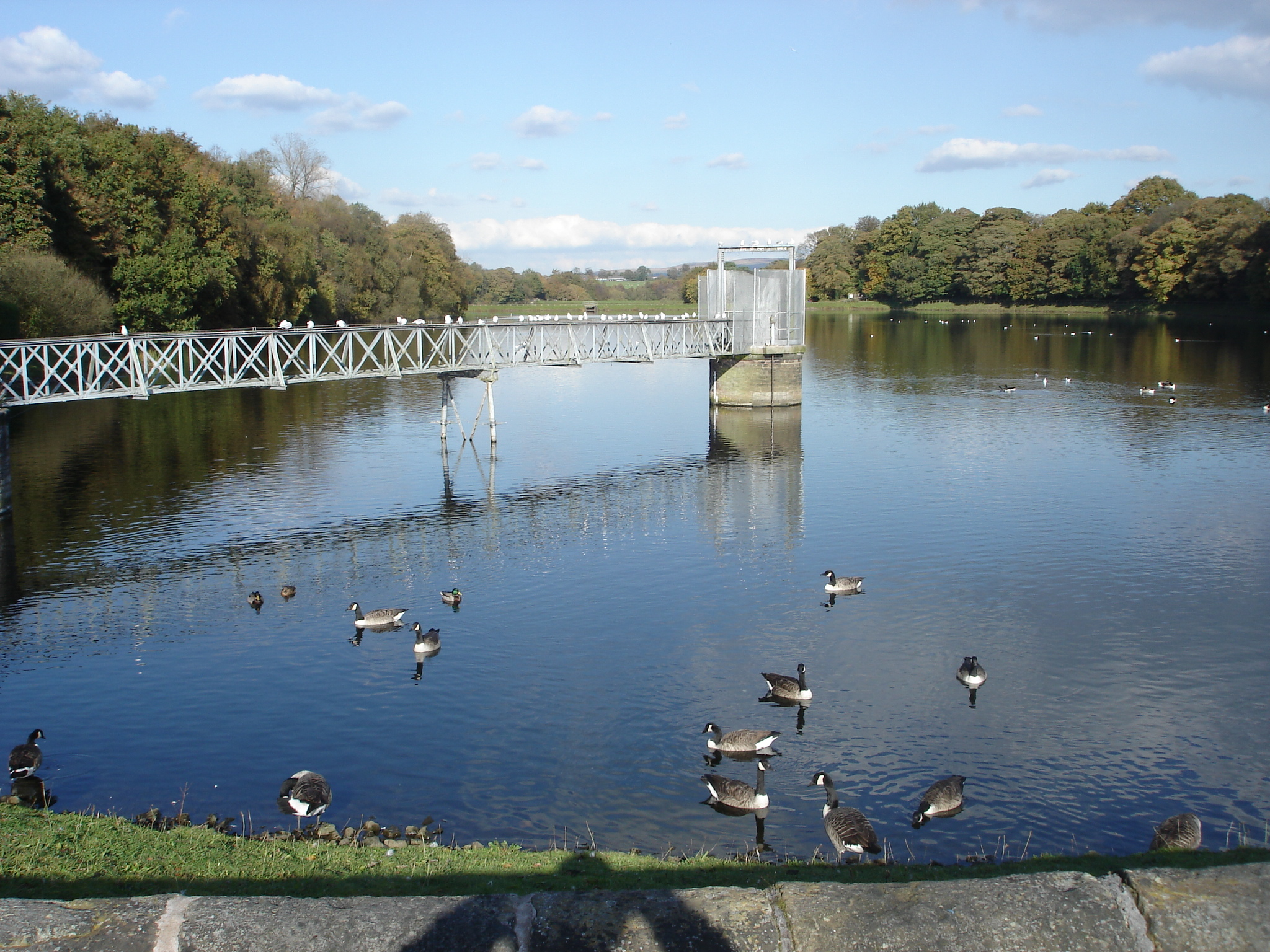
Worthington Reservoir

Worthington Lakes lie within the Douglas Valley to the north of the village. The lakes, which are actually three reservoirs—Worthington, Arley and Adlington—were built in the mid-1800s to supply Wigan with drinking water. They are fed by the River Douglas, which originates on the moors above Rivington. The river's natural course was diverted through a tunnel before the reservoirs were created, as it was not clean enough for drinking water. Today, the lakes form part of a 50-acre (20 ha) country park featuring a nature reserve and accessible footpaths.

== See also ==
- Listed buildings in Worthington, Greater Manchester
