= John Scales Avery =

American theoretical chemist (1933–2024)

- Born: May 26, 1933; Lebanon
- Died: January 4, 2024 (aged 90)

John Scales Avery (May 26, 1933 – January 4, 2024) was an American theoretical chemist noted for his research publications in quantum chemistry, thermodynamics, evolution, and history of science. Since the early 1990s, Avery had been an active world peace activist. During these years, he was part of a group associated with the Pugwash Conferences on Science and World Affairs. In 1995, this group received the Nobel Peace Prize for their efforts. He was an associate professor in quantum chemistry at the University of Copenhagen. His 2003 book Information Theory and Evolution set forth the view that the phenomenon of life, including its origin and evolution, including human cultural evolution, has its background situated over thermodynamics, statistical mechanics, and information theory. Avery died on January 4, 2024, at the age of 90.

== Early life ==
Avery was born in Lebanon on May 26, 1933, to American parents. Avery's parents were both born in the United States, in the state of Michigan, where they studied at the University of Michigan. His father studied medicine while his mother studied bacteriology. After graduation, his parents did research together at the Marine Biological Laboratory in Woods Hole, Massachusetts. Later, his father did research in a borderline area between physics and medicine with Arthur Holly Compton, discoverer of the "Compton effect", at the University of Chicago. In 1926, his father moved the family to Beirut, where his father worked as a professor of anatomy at the American University of Beirut. The family stayed in Beirut until the start of World War II. It was during these tumultuous years that John Scales Avery was born.

== Education ==
- 1950 – graduated, Phillips Academy, Andover, Mass.
- 1954 – B.Sc., physics, M.I.T
- 1955 – M.Sc., physics, University of Chicago
- 1965 – Ph.D., theoretical chemistry, Imperial College, London

== Thermodynamics ==
In his recent 2003 book Information Theory and Evolution (2nd Edition, 2012), Avery combines information theory with thermodynamics to account for the phenomenon of life, including its origin and evolution. Since the beginning of the formulation of the second law of thermodynamics in the 1860s, which states that the entropy, or disorder, of an isolated system tends to increase with time, there has been a debate as to how this law relates to the "ordering" process of evolution. The apparent paradox between the second law of thermodynamics and the high degree of order and complexity produced by living systems, according to Avery, has its resolution "in the information content of the Gibbs free energy that enters the biosphere from outside sources."

== Activism ==
John Avery at a Pugwash Conference on Science and World Affairs

Since 1990, Avery had been the Contact Person for Denmark at the Pugwash Conferences on Science and World Affairs. In 1995, Avery was part of a group that shared in the Nobel Peace Prize for their work in the 1990s in organizing the Pugwash Conferences on Science and World Affairs. In 1998, Avery was elected to the Danish Peace Commission. From 1988 to 1997, Avery was the Technical Advisor at the World Health Organization, Regional Office for Europe. In 2004, Avery became the Chairman of the Danish Peace Academy.

== Books ==
- Avery, John. (2012). Information Theory and Evolution. World Scientific. (2nd Edition)
- Avery, John. (2005). Science and Society , 2nd Ed. (PDF, 375 pgs.). Copenhagen: H.C. Orsted Institute.
- Avery, John. (2004). Calculus and Differential Equations – an introductory book. (PDF, 135 pgs.). University of Copenhagen: Pari New Learning Publications.
- Avery, John. (2002). Space-Age Science and Stone-Age Politics (PDF, 272 pgs.) Danish Peace Academy: Danish Pugwash Group.
- Avery, John (1997) Progress, Poverty and Population, Frank Cass, London, (1997)

Scientific books:

- Hyperspherical Harmonics and Generalized Sturmians, by J. Avery, Kluwer Academic Publishers, Dordrecht, Netherlands, 2000
- Hyperspherical Harmonics; Applications in Quantum Theory, by J. Avery, Kluwer Academic Publishers, Dordrecht, 1989
- Creation and Annihilation Operators, by J. Avery, McGraw-Hill, 1976
- The Quantum Theory of Atoms, Molecules and Photons, by J. Avery, McGraw-Hill, 1972

As well as more than 150 [www.ki.ku.dk/dokumenter/PDF/Publications-JS-Avery.pdf].
