= Every baronets =

Title in the Baronetage of England

Escutcheon of the Every Baronets

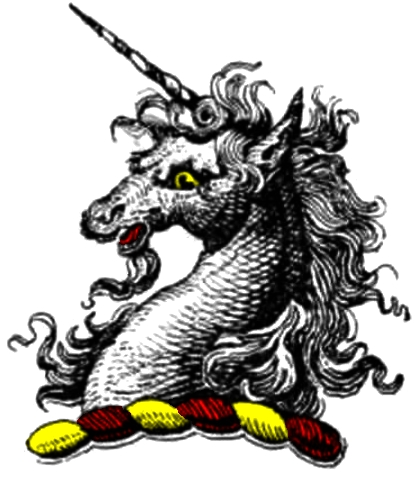
The heraldic crest of the Every Baronets

The Every Baronetcy, of Egginton in the County of Derby, is a title in the Baronetage of England. It was created on 26 May 1641 for Simon Every, Member of Parliament for Leicester in 1640 and a supporter of the Royalist cause in the Civil War. Born into the Every family of Dorset and Somerset, and a cousin to the Brice family of Somerset, he married Anne, daughter and co-heir of Sir Henry Leigh, of Egginton, Derbyshire. After his marriage, Every settled at Egginton.

The family seat of Egginton Hall burnt down in 1736, and was replaced by the eighth baronet (the great-great-grandson of the fourth) with a new house, which was demolished in 1954.

== Notable baronets ==
The fourth baronet was a captain in the Royal Navy and a supporter of William III. He was High Sheriff of Derbyshire in 1718. The fifth baronet was Rector of Egginton and of Navenby, Lincolnshire. The sixth baronet was High Sheriff of Derbyshire in 1749. The seventh Baronet was Rector of Waddington, Lincolnshire. The eighth baronet was High Sheriff of Derbyshire in 1783. The current baronet was High Sheriff for Derbyshire in 2009.

== Every baronets, of Egginton ==
- Sir Simon Every, 1st Baronet (1603–1647)
- Sir Henry Every, 2nd Baronet (1629–1700)
- Sir Henry Every, 3rd Baronet (1653–1709)
- Sir John Every, 4th Baronet (1654–1729)
- Sir Simon Every, 5th Baronet (1658–1753)
- Sir Henry Every, 6th Baronet (1708–1755)
- Sir John Every, 7th Baronet (1708–1779)
- Sir Edward Every, 8th Baronet (1754–1786)
- Sir Henry Every, 9th Baronet (1777–1855)
- Sir Henry Flower Every, 10th Baronet (1830–1893)
- Sir Edward Oswald Every, 11th Baronet (1886–1959)
- Sir John Simon Every, 12th Baronet (1914–1988)
- Sir Henry John Michael Every, 13th Baronet (born 1947)

The heir apparent to the baronetcy is the 13th Baronet's eldest son, Edward James Henry Every (born 1975).

== Arms ==
Coat of arms of Every baronets

Crest
A Demi-Unicorn Argent, Guttée-de-sang, and crined Or.
Escutcheon
Erminois, two Chevronels Azure, between two Chevronels Gules.
Motto
SUUM CUIQUE (Every man to his own)
