= Christopher L. Avery =

American judge (1872–1956)

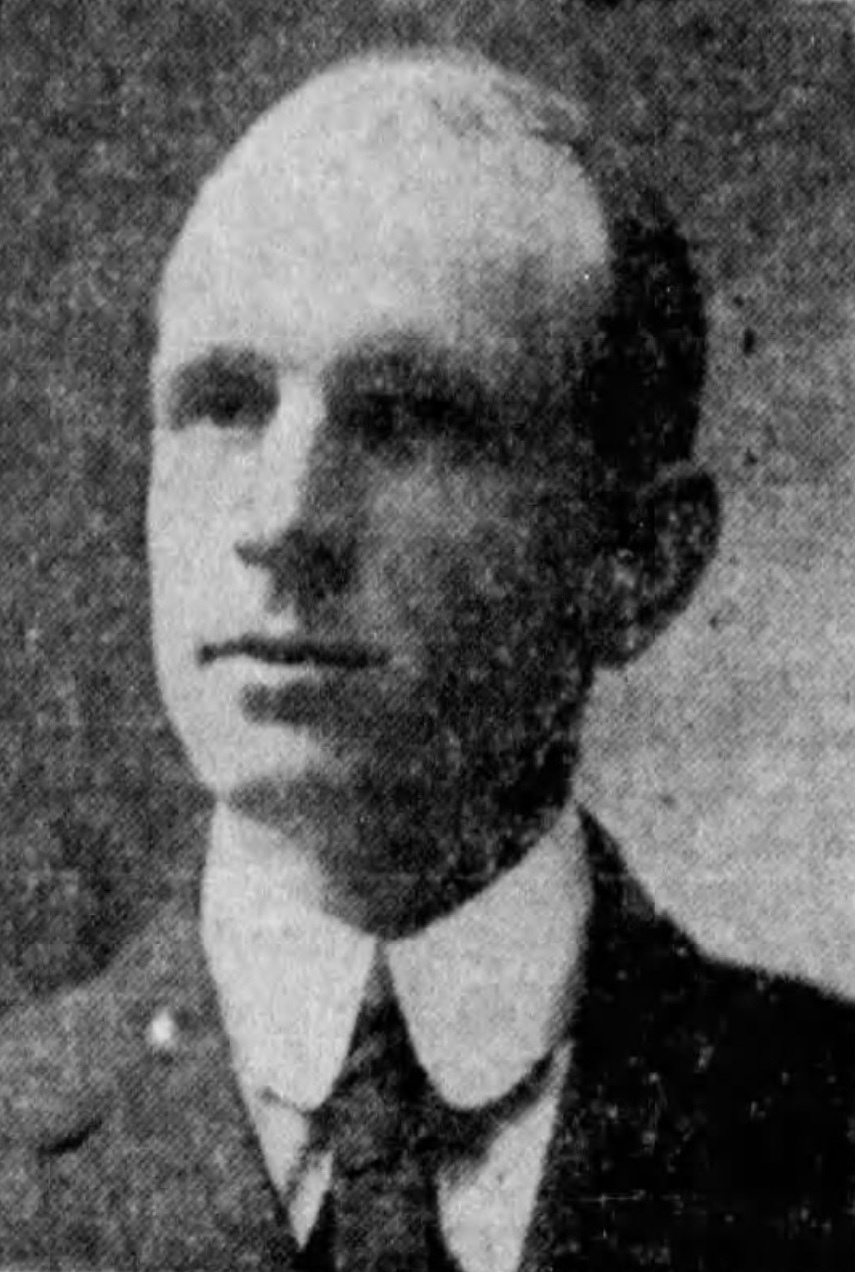
Judge Christopher L. Avery

Christopher Lester Avery (September 4, 1872 – May 6, 1956) was an American lawyer and judge who served as a justice of the Connecticut Supreme Court from 1930 to 1942.

== Early life, education, and military service ==
Born in Groton, Connecticut, the fifth of six children born to Christopher Lester Avery and Ellen Barber Copp, Avery attended Norwich Academy and received a B.A. from Yale College in 1893. As an undergraduate, Avery was among the academic leaders of his class and was active in debating and athletics, being the middleweight wrestling champion at Yale.

After teaching history for a year in a small Kentucky college, Avery received a law degree from the Yale Law School in 1897. He gained admission to the bar in New York that same year and entered the practice of law in New York City, with the firm of Cravath, Swaine & Moore. His legal career was interrupted by service in the United States Navy during the 1898 Spanish–American War, as quartermaster on the USS Jason. In 1903 he moved to New London, Connecticut, where he was a member of the firm of Waller, Waller, Avery and Gallup.

== Political and judicial service ==
In 1913 he was elected as a Democrat to the Connecticut House of Representatives, where he served on the judiciary committee. In 1915, during World War I, he served as chairman of the New London Draft Board. In December 1920, Governor Marcus H. Holcomb appointed Avery to the Connecticut Superior Court.

In 1929, as Chief Justice George W. Wheeler approached his mandatory retirement age, it was expected that a sitting associate justice would be promoted to chief justice, and as the chief superior court judge, Avery was reportedly considered the logical choice to fill the vacant associate justice seat that would thereby be created. On April 18, 1929, Avery was indeed nominated by Governor John H. Trumbull for appointment as associate justice of the state supreme court, to the seat vacated by Justice William M. Maltbie's elevation to the position of chief justice.

Avery served for 12 years, and retired from the supreme court in 1942 upon reaching the mandatory retirement age of 70. Avery was also chairman of the Groton–New London Bridge Commission, overseeing construction of the bridge over the Thames River connecting the two cities, which would later be named the Gold Star Memorial Bridge. He resigned from the commission in 1943 after the bridge became operational.

Outside of his judicial service, he served as a trustee of Connecticut College from 1917 until his death in 1956. He was also a trustee of the Bill Memorial Library and chairman of the Groton Board of Finance from 1946 until his death. He was a director of the New London City National Bank and the Mariners Savings Bank. In 1939, he became chairman of the board of the Savings Bank of New London, remaining active in bank affairs until shortly before his death.

== Personal life and death ==
Avery was married three times. His first marriage, in 1901, was to Betsey Ann Bouse of Groton, with whom he had one son before her death in 1903. In 1906, he married Elizabeth Anderson Brander of Brooklyn, who died in 1915; four children from that marriage survived him. In 1917, he married Ethel Gray Bailey of Groton, who survived him, along with six children in total.

Avery died of coronary thrombosis at his home in Groton, at the age of 83. Up until the time of his death, he had remained active in civic and financial affairs, and appeared to be in good health.

Political offices
| Preceded by George W. Wheeler | Justice of the Connecticut Supreme Court; 1930–1942 | Succeeded by Edwin C. Dickenson |
