= Simon Every =

English politician

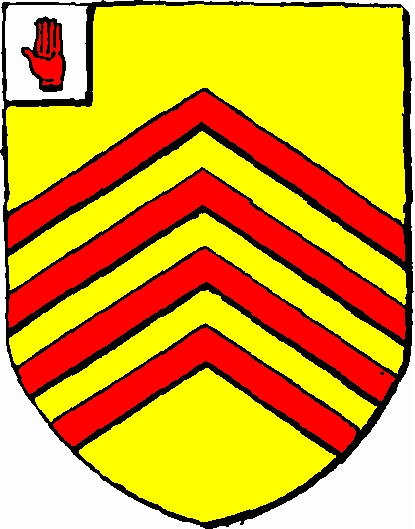
The Coat of Arms of the Every Baronets

Sir Simon Every, 1st Baronet (1603–1647) was an English politician who sat in the House of Commons in 1640. He was a supporter of the Royalist cause in the English Civil War, and the first of the Every Baronets.

Every was born at Chardstock (then in Dorset, located in Devon since 1896) to John Every of Wycroft Castle, and his wife Elizabeth Lambert. He married Anne Leigh, daughter of Sir Henry Leigh of Egginton, and after marriage took Egginton Hall as his seat. He was elected Member of Parliament for Leicester for the Short Parliament in April 1640, and created a baronet, of Egginton in the County of Derby in the Baronetage of England on 26 May 1641. He suffered for his support of the King during the Civil War and his estates were compounded, along with those of his cousins Worthington and John Brice of Dinnington.

Parliament of England
Vacant Parliament suspended since 1629	Member of Parliament for Leicester; 1640; With: Thomas Coke	Succeeded by Lord Grey of Groby; Thomas Coke
Baronetage of England
New creation	Baronet (of Egginton); 1641–1647	Succeeded by Henry Every
