= List of unreleased songs recorded by Britney Spears =

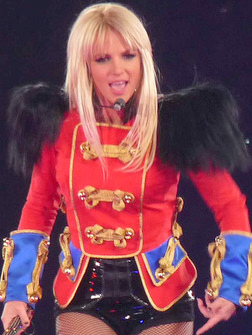
Spears performing at The Circus Starring Britney Spears tour (2009)

The following songs recorded by American singer Britney Spears were not released commercially. Some songs have been given to other recording artists for recording. The list encompasses studio-quality recording by Spears that were not commercially or promotionally released by a reputable label, documented demo versions of songs not released in any form, early demo versions of released songs where there is a substantial difference to the released versions (such as completely different melody), and officially commissioned Spears-related professional remixes not chosen for release.

Spears has written and recorded material that has never been officially released. Several unreleased songs had been planned for inclusion on her studio albums ...Baby One More Time (1999), Britney (2001), In the Zone (2003), Blackout (2007), Circus (2008), Femme Fatale (2011), Britney Jean (2013) and Glory (2016), but were ultimately rejected. There are many registered tracks included under the unreleased section that have not been commercially released, but have gained media attention or were confirmed by Spears herself. Many of her unreleased songs have been registered (usually by her company Britney Spears Music) with professional bodies such as the United States Copyright Office, Broadcast Music Incorporated (BMI), and American Society of Composers, Authors and Publishers (ASCAP).

Spears's unreleased material includes songs recorded by her and demo versions, some co-written by artists such as Justin Timberlake and Lady Gaga. In 1997, she recorded "Today", originally meant for Toni Braxton. Snippets of "Rebellion" and "Little Me" were released on Spears's official website in 2006. She has also co-written and recorded songs that were later given to other artists, such as her sister Jamie Lynn Spears, Selena Gomez and BoA. A collection of songs that leaked on October 6, 2011 received the name of "Britmas".

== Songs ==
Key
†	Denotes songs registered with Broadcast Music Incorporated (BMI)
‡	Denotes songs registered with American Society of Composers, Authors and Publishers (ASCAP)
†‡	Denotes songs registered with BMI and ASCAP
*	Denotes songs cited by producers and/or Spears herself
‡*	Denotes songs registered with ASCAP and cited by producers and/or Spears herself

Song	Writer(s)	Date	Album	Notes
"911"^{†}	Kara DioGuardi; J. R. Rotem	October 6, 2011	Blackout	Known alternatively as "Nine One One"; Published by Bug Music and Southside Independent Music Publishing
"Abroad"	Marcella Araica; Nate Hills; Ezekiel Lewis; Balewa Muhammad; Candice Nelson; Patrick M. Smith	October 6, 2011	Circus	Published by Christopher Matthew Music and Hitco Music
"All That She Wants"	Britney Spears; Jonas Berggren; Ulf Ekberg	January 24, 2008	Blackout	The chorus samples Swedish group Ace of Base's 1993 hit "All That She Wants"; Verses are taken from a poem called "Remembrance of Who I Am", written by Spears in 2006
"All the Way"^{‡}	Cathy Dennis; Łukasz Gottwald; Jack Splash	—N/a	Blackout	Published by American Society of Composers, Authors and Publishers
"Am I a Sinner?"	Britney Spears; BT; Brian Kierulf; Joshua Schwartz	July 28, 2010	Britney	Known alternatively as "Sinner"; Included in the 25th anniversary edition of Britney
"And Then We Kiss"	Britney Spears; Mark Taylor; Paul Barry	September 2011	In the Zone	A remix by Junkie XL was officially released on B in the Mix: The Remixes (2005); Recorded as "Ja Siis Ma Teen" by Estonian pop group Slam
"Because I Like It"	Gregg Alexander; Rick Nowels	September 21, 2024	In the Zone	
"Boyfriend"	Faheem Najm	—N/a	Blackout	Confirmed by T-Pain in an interview with MTV; Recorded by Asia Cruise for her shelved debut album Who is Asia Cruise?
"Bring Me Home"*	Britney Spears; Brian Kierulf; Joshua Schwartz	—N/a	Britney	Spears revealed in a few interviews that "Bring Me Home" was her favorite song.; Inspired by the movie Crossroads, along with "I Run Away".
"Burning Up"	Madonna	March 24, 2014	—N/a	Cover of Madonna's song; Spears performed it on select dates of the Femme Fatale Tour (2011)
"Conscience"	Britney Spears; Michelle Bell; Larry Gates	January 22, 2015	In the Zone	Known alternatively as "Conscious"
"Crazy Girls"	Gregg Alexander; Rick Nowels	September 21, 2024	In the Zone	
"Dangerous"	Greg Kurstin; Nicole Morier	October 6, 2011	Circus	The song was later given to the Japanese idol group Momoiro Clover Z; the song was translated into Japanese and rewritten under the new name "Rock the Boat" on the album Hakkin no Yoake.
"Disguise My Love"^{‡}	Michelle Bell; Henrik Jonback; Christian Karlsson; Pontus Winnberg	—N/a	In the Zone	Published by Elleganza Music Publishing and Universal Music Corporation; Michelle Bell confirmed that Spears recorded the song
"Downtown"^{†}	Kara DioGuardi; J. R. Rotem	—N/a	Blackout	Published by Bug Music and Southside Independent Music Publishing LLC
"Dramatic"	Britney Spears; Damon Elliott	April 16, 2010	Blackout	In March 2008, a duet version with Heidi Montag was sent to Ryan Seacrest, who premiered it on his show On Air with Ryan Seacrest. Both Jive Records and Montag's representatives denied having knowledge of the recording.; Produced by Damon Elliott
"Everyday"^{†‡}	Xandy Barry; Wally Gagel; Britney Spears	October 6, 2011	Circus	Known alternatively as "Every Day"; Published by Britney Spears Music, Laurel Street Music Inc, Production Club Music and Universal Music Corporation
"Exaholic"^{†}	Britney Spears; Antonina Armato; Tim James	February 2, 2021	Glory	Registered by Broadcast Music Incorporated
"Father's Eyes"	Arnthor Birgisson; Ina Wroldsen	—N/a	Britney Jean	Registered by Broadcast Music Incorporated; Recorded and released by Ask Embla (a duo of Birgisson and Wroldsen) on their debut album Northern Light (2013) and separately by pop group Steps for their seventh album What the Future Holds Pt. 2 (2021).
"Follow Me"^{†}	Britney Spears; Henrik Jonback; Christian Karlsson; Pontus Winnberg	—N/a	—N/a	Written for sister Jamie Lynn Spears as the theme song of television series Zoey 101; Version with Spears' vocals are registered at BMI; Published by Britney Spears Music and Universal Music Z Songs
"Follow My Fingers"	Cathy Dennis; Freescha; Nicole Morier; Britney Spears	—N/a	Circus	Published by Britney Spears Music, Hawk Arm Music, Sizzlegodlessgod Music and Universal Music Z Songs; Registered in 2010 with the United States Copyright Office
"Free"	Britney Spears; Guy Chambers; Cathy Dennis	—N/a	In the Zone	Registered with Australasian Performing Right Association (APRA).
"Giving It Up for Love"	Britney Spears; Kara DioGuardi; Scott Storch; Robert Waller	—N/a	In the Zone	Published by EMI Music Publishing.
"Graffiti My Soul"	Miranda Cooper; Lisa Cowling; Brian Higgins; Tim Powell; Peplab	—N/a	In the Zone	Recorded by Girls Aloud for their second album What Will the Neighbours Say? (2004)
"Grow"^{‡}*	Britney Spears; Steve Anderson; Lisa Greene	—N/a	Blackout	Described as an "electro-ballad" by Steve Anderson; Published by Universal Polygram International Publishing Inc
"Guilty"^{†}	Joseph Belmatti; Mich Hansen; Balewa Muhammad; Britney Spears	February 22, 2015	In the Zone	Known alternatively as "Guilty Kiss"; Samples Prince's "Kiss" (1986); Published by Warner-Tamerlane Publishing Corporation
"Hey Ma"	Armando Christian Perez; Jose Balvin; Karla Cabello; Jamie Sanderson	December 21, 2017	—N/a	Recorded for The Fate of the Furious soundtrack; Features vocals by Romeo Santos; Released on March 10, 2017 with Camila Cabello and J Balvin replacing Spears and Santos, respectively
"Higher You Take Me"^{†}	Dean Hajas	—N/a	Britney	Registered by Broadcast Music Incorporated; Original version of "I'm a Slave 4 U"
"Hollow"	Britney Spears; Cathy Dennis; Christian Karlsson; Pontus Winnberg	—N/a	In the Zone	Previously registered with EMI
"Hooked On"^{†‡}	Pharrell Williams	October 17, 2007	Blackout	Known alternatively as "Sugarfall"; Features vocals by Pharrell Williams; Published by EMI Blackwood Music Inc and Songs for Beans
"I Ain't Runnin' Away"	Gregg Alexander; Rick Nowels	September 15, 2024	In the Zone	
"I Feel So Free with You"	—N/a	October 28, 2019	—N/a	Recorded in 2018.; Features vocals by Pitbull and Marc Anthony
"I Have Nothing"*	David Foster; Linda Thompson	February 18, 2024	—N/a	Originally recorded by Whitney Houston, and included on the soundtrack album The Bodyguard (1992); Recorded by Spears in 1997, and presented by manager Larry Rudolph to a number of record labels.; Spears got signed to Jive Records after singing the song in front of the label's executives.; A cassette tape of this song, alongside three more cassette tapes of demos of this era were put on auction on the site "Julien's Auctions"
"I've Been Loving You Too Long"	Otis Redding; Jerry Butler	April 9, 2019	Blackout	Cover of Otis Redding's song; Produced by Christopher "Notes" Olsen, who also produced "Rebellion"
"Instant Déjà Vu"*	Gregg Alexander; Rick Nowels	August 15, 2016	In the Zone	
"It's Britney Spears, Baby"^{†}	Wade Robson	—N/a	—N/a	Published by Wajero Sound
"Just Let Me Go"	Evan Bogart; J. R. Rotem	December 2, 2011	Blackout	Known alternatively as "Love 2 Love U"; Samples Madonna's "La Isla Bonita" (1987); Registered with Australasian Performing Right Association (APRA).; Later given to and recorded by The Cheetah Girls, on their second studio album, TCG, under the title "Fuego
"King of My Castle"	Chris Brann; Dave Lambert; Carsten Mortensen	June 25, 2021	The Singles Collection	Features vocals by Lucas Secon; According to Spears' fan site, the song was recorded during sessions for The Singles Collection; British singer Shayne Ward was added to the song at a later date
"Kiss You All Over"^{†}	Garrett Hamler; Brian Kidd	October 17, 2007	Blackout	Known alternatively as "Kiss Me All Over"; Published by Dollanaire Publishing, Hitco Music and Team S Dot Publishing
"Let Me Take You There"^{†}	Full Force; Britney Spears	July 9, 2018	...Baby One More Time	It was included on a cassette tape labeled "Britney Spears Demos" from November 1997, submitted to various labels by Spears' manager Larry Rudolph. The handwritten list of songs includes "Soda Pop", "From the Bottom of My Broken Heart", "Thinking About You", "Wishing on a Falling Star", "Let Me Take You There", "You Got It All", "Love the Hurt Away", and "Nothing Less than Real".; The cassette tape was put on auction on the website Julien's Auctions
"Like I'm Fallin'"^{‡}	Michelle Bell; Britney Spears	—N/a	In the Zone	Known alternatively as "Falling"; Published by Elleganza Music Publishing and Universal Music Corporation
"Little Me"	Britney Spears; Guy Sigsworth	April 7, 2006 (snippet)	—N/a	Known alternatively as "For My Sister"; Known alternatively as "Just Yesterday"; Published by Britney Spears Music and Universal Music Z Songs
"Look Who's Talking Now"^{†}	Michelle Bell; Britney Spears; Christian Karlsson; Pontus Winnberg	January 9, 2012	In the Zone	Recorded and released as "Look Who's Talking" on BoA's English debut album BoA (2009); Published by Britney Spears Music and Universal Music Z Songs; Registered in 2010 with the United States Copyright Office
"Love Is On"	Eric Foster White	—N/a	...Baby One More Time	Recorded by Sharon Cuneta for her fifteenth album All I Ever Want (2001)
"Love's Supposed 2 Be"*	Britney Spears; Balewa Muhammad; Bart Migal; Rob Fusari	—N/a	In the Zone	Mentioned by Rob Fusari.
"Luv the Hurt Away"	Curtis T. Bedeau; Gerard R. Charles; Brian P. George; Lucien J. George; Paul Anthony George	May 7, 2006	...Baby One More Time	Known alternatively as "Love the Hurt Away"; Features R&B group Full Force; Posted on Full Force's official website; Published by Forceful Music and Universal Music Z Songs
"Mad Love"	Bradley Daymond; Lisa Greene; Alex Greggs; Rodney Price; Dennis Shaw	July 29, 2010	In the Zone	Also intended for Blackout (2007) and Circus (2008); Samples Lafayette Afro Rock Band's "Darkest Light" (1975)
"Money, Love and Happiness"^{†‡}	Britney Spears; Michelle Bell; Nadir Khayat; Nanna Kristiansson	April 5, 2012	In the Zone	Published by Elleganza Music Publishing, EMI Blackwood Music Inc, and Universal Music Corporation
"My Big Secret"^{†}	Chad Hugo; Pharrell Williams	—N/a	Britney	Also intended for In the Zone (2003); Originally meant for Janet Jackson, but failed to make her seventh album All for You (2001); Published by EMI Blackwood Music Inc and Songs for Beans; Included in the 25th anniversary edition of Britney
"My Love Was Always There"^{†}	Britney Spears; Steve Morales	—N/a	—N/a	Performed by Spears on select dates of the Dream Within a Dream Tour in 2002; It is unknown whether a studio version was recorded; Recorded as "Maybe" by Enrique Iglesias for his second English-language album Escape (2001)
"Mystic Man"^{†}	Britney Spears	—N/a	—N/a	Performed by Spears on select dates of the Dream Within a Dream Tour in 2002; Possibly written about Justin Timberlake; It is unknown whether a studio version was recorded
"Need You Tonight"	Andrew Farriss; Michael Hutchence	—N/a	In the Zone	Cover of INXS' song; Confirmed by Rolling Stone
"Not Heart Broken"	Corte Ellis	—N/a	Blackout	Produced by Danja
"Nothing Less than Real"^{†}	—N/a	—N/a	...Baby One More Time	It was included on a cassette tape labeled "Britney Spears Demos" from November 1997, submitted to various labels by Spears' manager Larry Rudolph. The handwritten list of songs includes "Soda Pop", "From the Bottom of My Broken Heart", "Thinking About You", "Wishing on a Falling Star", "Let Me Take You There", "You Got It All", "Love the Hurt Away", and "Nothing Less than Real".; The cassette tape was put on auction on the site "Julien's Auctions"
"One of a Kind"	Faheem Najm	—N/a	Blackout	Confirmed by T-Pain in an interview with MTV
"Ouch"^{‡}	Britney Spears; Michelle Bell; Nanna Kristiansson	April 11, 2012	In the Zone	Published by Elleganza Music Publishing and Universal Music Corporation
"Paradise"^{†‡}	Xandy Barry; Wally Gagel; Britney Spears	—N/a	Circus	Published by Laurel Street Music Inc and Production Club Music
"Peep Show"^{‡}	Britney Spears; Michelle Bell; Larry Gates	March 2012 (snippet)	In the Zone	Michelle Bell said on her Tumblr page she is unable to release the full song
"Pleasure You"	Britney Spears; Warren Largosa; Anthony Moran	July 4, 2012	In the Zone	Was stolen and leaked with vocals from former pop singer Don Philip on his SoundCloud account.; Known alternatively as "Say What"
"Police"	William Adams; Jean Baptiste; Cameron Thomaz	—N/a	Britney Jean	Features vocals by Wiz Khalifa
"Pull Out"^{†}	Garrett Hamler; La Marquis Jefferson; Craig D. Love; Jonathan Smith	October 17, 2007	Blackout	Published by C Amore Music, Hitco Music, Lil Jizzel Music Publishing, Songs of Universal Inc, and Team S Dot Publishing; Known alternatively as "Pull It"
"Pulse"^{‡}	Joseph Belmatti; Mich Hansen; Remee Jackman; Lorne Tennant	—N/a	In the Zone	Recorded by Orchestral Manoeuvres in the Dark (OMD) for their eleventh studio album, History of Modern (2010); Published by Chrysalis Music
"Rebellion"	Britney Spears; Christopher Olsen	June 20, 2006 (snippet)	Blackout	The song was first teased when Spears posted a fifty-one-second snippet and an eleven-second snippet with alternate production on her official website. It was accompanied by an animation of her face transforming into a Bengal Tiger over the sound of growls and loud breathing.
"Red Hot Lipstick"	Britney Spears; Doug Elkins	March 13, 2018	Blackout	Produced by Doug Elkins
"Rockstar"^{‡}	Britney Spears; Penelope Magnet; Thabiso Nikhereanye; Christopher Stewart	October 6, 2011	In the Zone	Published by 7 Syllables Music, Marchninenth Music, Songs of Peer LTD, and Tabulous Music
"Sacred"	Britney Spears; Guy Chambers; Cathy Dennis	—N/a	In the Zone	According to Guy Chambers, Spears says "fuck" in the song
"Second Chances"	Alja Jackson	—N/a	Femme Fatale	Confirmed by Scott Storch
"She'll Never Be Me"^{‡}	Britney Spears; Brad Daymond; Alex Greggs; Justin Timberlake	July 2008	Britney	Known alternatively as "Never Be Me"; Published by Tennman Tunes; Released as a single in October 2026; Included in the 25th anniversary edition of Britney
"Sippin' On"^{‡}	Britney Spears; Penelope Magnet; Thabiso Nikhereanye; Christopher Stewart	September 2007	In the Zone	Also intended for Blackout (2007) with a commissioned remix featuring rapper AC; Known alternatively as "What Ya Sippin On"; Published by 7 Syllables Music, Marchninenth Music, Songs of Peer LTD, and Tabulous Music
"Speed Seduction"	Lauren Christy; Graham Edwards; Scott Spock	—N/a	In the Zone	Recorded in the same session as "Shadow"; Christy also talked about in a podcast related to Spears
"State of Grace"^{‡}*	Steve Anderson; Lisa Greene; Steve Lee	August 17, 2007	Blackout	Recorded as "Entre Nous Et Le Sol" by Christophe Willem for his second album, Caféine (2009); Published by W B Music Group
"Stay"*	Britney Spears; Jimmy Harry; Sheppard Solomon	—N/a	In the Zone	According to the song's producer Jimmy Harry, it resembles "Ray of Light" by Madonna.
"Strangest Love"^{†}	Guy Chambers; Brian McFadden	December 25, 2011	In the Zone	Registered with Broadcast Music Incorporated
"Strip"*	Britney Spears; Jimmy Harry; Sheppard Solomon	—N/a	In the Zone	Recorded in 2002.; Removed from the final track listing as the song title was similar to the name of Christina Aguilera's album Stripped (2002).; Said to be Spears and her manager Larry Rudolph's favorite song at the time.
"Take Off"^{‡}	Britney Spears; Michelle Bell; Christian Karlsson; Pontus Winnberg	May 21, 2017	In the Zone	Published by Elleganza Music Publishing and Universal Music Corporation
"Take the Bait"^{†}	Marcella Araica; Nate Hills; Ezekiel Lewis; Balewa Muhammad; Candice Nelson; Patrick M. Smith	—N/a	Circus	Published by Christopher Matthew Music and Hitco Music
"Telephone"^{‡}*	Stefani Germanotta; Rodney Jerkins	May 2, 2010	Circus	Also intended for The Singles Collection (2009); Lady Gaga eventually recorded the song, replacing Spears with Beyoncé, and released it on her studio album The Fame Monster (2009)
"The Other Side"	Andreas Carlsson; Kristian Lundin	April 25, 2024	...Baby One More Time	Produced by Kristian Lundin
"This Kiss"	Britney Spears; Nicole Morier	April 29, 2012	Circus	
"Tilt Ya Head Back"	Cornell Haynes Jr. Dorian Moore; Tegemold Newton; Curtis Mayfield	June 24, 2021	Sweat	Nelly recorded the song featuring Britney Spears, but it failed to be included on his studio album Sweat (2004); Eventually, Nelly recorded the song, replacing Spears with Christina Aguilera, and released it on Sweat (2004)
"To Love Let Go"^{†}	Tom Craskey; Britney Spears; Devo Springsteen	September 2007	Blackout	Known alternatively as "Let Go"; Published by Britney Spears Music, Craskey Music, Grown Your Own Music, and Universal Music Z Songs; Registered in 2008 with the United States Copyright Office
"Today"	Darren Wittington	—N/a	—N/a	Originally recorded by Toni Braxton, but failed to make her second album Secrets (1996); Recorded by Spears in 1997, and presented by manager Larry Rudolph to a number of record labels
"Unbroken"^{†}	Lindy Robbins; Fraser T. Smith	February 16, 2014	Femme Fatale	Published by BMI
Untitled DFA demo	Britney Spears; DFA	January 4, 2006	—N/a	
"Untitled Lullaby"^{†}	William Anderson; Britney Spears	August 23, 2007	Blackout	Known alternatively as "Untitled/Lullaby"; Known alternatively as "Baby Boy"; Published by Britney Spears Music, Delightful Music LTD, Universal Music Z Songs, and Warner-Tamerlane Publishing Corp; Registered in 2008 with the United States Copyright Office
"Untouchable"^{†}	LaShawn Daniels; Freddie Jerkins; Rodney Jerkins; Kenneth Pratt; Britney Spears	—N/a	In the Zone	Published by ASCAP
"Weakness"^{†}	Britney Spears; Kara DioGuardi; Brian Kierulf; Josh Schwartz	—N/a	—N/a	Performed by Spears on select dates of the Dream Within a Dream Tour in 2002; Possibly intended for Spears' fourth studio album, In the Zone; It is unknown whether a studio version was recorded.
"Welcome to Me"^{†}	Wade Robson; Britney Spears; Carole Bayer Sager	May 11, 2014	In the Zone	Published by Carol Bayer Sager Music and Wajero Sound
"When I Say So"	Britney Spears; BT; Brian Kierulf; Joshua M. Schwartz	July 28, 2010	Britney	Known alternatively as "Till I Say So"; Published by Britney Spears Music, Chrysalis One Songs LLC, Emotech Music, Kierulf Songs, Mugsy Boy Publishing, and Universal Music Z Songs.; Registered in 2004 with the United States Copyright Office; Included in the 25th anniversary edition of Britney
"Whiplash"^{†‡}	Greg Kurstin; Nicole Morier; Britney Spears	—N/a	Circus	Recorded by Selena Gomez & the Scene for their third album, When the Sun Goes Down (2011); Published by Britney Spears Music, EMI April Music Inc, Kurstin Music, and Universal Music Z Songs
"Who Can She Trust?"	Britney Spears	—N/a	Blackout	Described by J.R. as an introspective composition written solely by Spears. She sings, "Where am I?/Where will I find my face?/Where will I find my faith?" over a snap music hip-hop beat, accompanied by the sound of a camera shutter clicking.
"Wishing on a Falling Star"^{†}	—N/a	—N/a	...Baby One More Time	It was included on a cassette tape labeled "Britney Spears Demos" from November 1997, submitted to various labels by Spears' manager Larry Rudolph. The handwritten list of songs includes "Soda Pop", "From the Bottom of My Broken Heart", "Thinking About You", "Wishing on a Falling Star", "Let Me Take You There", "You Got It All", "Love the Hurt Away", and "Nothing Less than Real".; The cassette tape was put on auction on the site "Julien's Auctions"
"Wonderland"^{†}	Jimmy Harry; Balewa Muhammad; Reza Safinia; Sheppard Solomon; Britney Spears	—N/a	In the Zone	According to songwriter Jimmy Harry, it has an electronic sound; Published by Irving Music
"You Can't Stop What You Can't Stop"	Britney Spears; Gregg Alexander; Rick Nowels	September 21, 2024	In the Zone	
"You Were My Home"^{†}	Britney Spears	—N/a	—N/a	Performed by Spears on select dates of the Dream Within a Dream Tour in 2002; Possibly intended for Spears' fourth studio album, In the Zone; It is unknown whether a studio version was recorded.
