= Kill the Lights (Britney Spears song) =

2008 song by Britney Spears

Song by Britney Spears

from the album Circus
- Studio: Glenwood Place Studios in Burbank, California; Chalice Recording Studios in Los Angeles, California
- Length: 3:59
- Label: Jive
- Songwriters: Nathaniel Hills; James Washington; Luke Boyd; Marcella Araica
- Producer: Danja

Music video
- "Kill the Lights" on YouTube

"Kill the Lights" is a song recorded by American singer Britney Spears, taken from her sixth studio album Circus (2008). It was written by Nathaniel Hills, James Washington, Luke Boyd and Marcella Araica, who previously worked with Spears on Blackout (2007). "Kill the Lights” is a song produced by Danja, that alludes to the singer's relationship with the paparazzi and the news media, while also addressing the consequences of becoming a celebrity. "Kill the Lights" received mostly positive reviews from music critics, who considered it a futuristic and sexy sequel to Spears' "Piece of Me" (2007), although they described her vocals as heavily produced.

Despite not being released as a single, "Kill the Lights" managed to peak at number eleven on the Billboard Bubbling Under Hot 100, while appearing on the Pop 100 and Pop 100 Airplay component charts. It also reached number sixty-nine on the Hot Canadian Digital Singles chart. An animated music video for the song directed by PUNY, portrays Spears avoiding the paparazzi and visiting another planet. "Kill the Lights" was included on a promotional CD of Spears' fragrance Circus Fantasy, and was featured on the fourth season of MTV's The Hills.

== Background ==
It was confirmed in 2008 that Spears was in the process of recording her sixth studio album. Spears' manager Larry Rudolph confirmed the singer would spend "her summer in the recording studio" to work on it. Despite no official album confirmation at the time, Rudolph revealed they were happy with her progress and that she had been working with a range of producers, such as Sean Garrett, Guy Sigsworth, Danja and Bloodshy & Avant. Danja later reported that he worked on the tracks at Chalice Recording Studios in Los Angeles, and Spears recorded them at Glenwood Place Studios in Burbank. He credited "Hans Zimmer's scores, such as Pirates of the Caribbean soundtracks" as a primary source of inspiration. Among the songs produced, "Kill the Lights" and "Blur" were included on the standard edition of Spears' sixth studio album, Circus (2008), while "Rock Boy" was included on the deluxe edition of it. The song appeared on a six-song mix of Circus that was released on November 13, 2008. "Kill the Lights" was co-written by Nathaniel "Danja" Hills, Marcella Araica, Luke Boyd and James Washington, who previously worked with the singer on her fifth studio album, Blackout (2007). On July 27, 2009, it was revealed through Spears' official website that "Radar" would be released as the fourth single from the album, despite rumors confirming the release of "Kill the Lights". The song was, however, included on a promotional CD of Spears' fragrance Circus Fantasy, along with the Junior Vasquez Club Circus Remix of "Circus".

== Music and lyrics ==
"Kill the Lights"
A 23-second sample of the song.

"Kill the Lights" alludes to Spears conflict with the paparazzi, which is perceived in lines such as "Mr. Photographer / I think I'm ready for my close-up / Tonight / Make sure you catch me from my good side". Jon Pareles of The New York Times said the song features "amid electronic blips and ominous artificial strings and horns", while Spears "alternately invites photographers closer and fends them off. 'They all wanna see', she warns prospective stars. 'Is life going to get the best of you?'". "Kill the Lights" features a similar theme to Spears' "Piece of Me" (2007) and was considered its sequel, while Caryn Ganz of Rolling Stone said the song "recalls the synth crush of 2007's Blackout." The song begins with a quote from Orson Welles' infamous radio adaptation of War of the Worlds, ('Ladies and gentlemen, we interrupt our program of dance music to bring you a special bulletin from the Intercontinental Radio News...') Music critics criticized the fact that Spears is introduced by Danja as "Our very own Pop princess / Now Queen of Pop", commenting that the honorific nickname "Queen of Pop" is attributed to American recording artist Madonna, while describing her vocals as heavily produced.

== Critical reception ==
"Kill the Lights" received mostly positive reviews from music critics. Stephen Thomas Erlewine of AllMusic said that "Kill the Lights" was a great "sleek and sexy" song, that should have been on Blackout instead of Circus. Anna Dimond of TV Guide commented that "Kill the Lights" shows that "even a pop star needs alone time. Especially with her special someone," and Jam!'s Darryl Sterdan considered it as a "futuristic and vaguely ominous dance-floor filler". John Murphy of musicOMH noted the song is "seemingly an open letter to Spears' paparazzi photographer ex-boyfriend with lines like 'Mr Photographer, I think I'm ready for my close-up' and 'is that money in your pocket, or are you just pleased to see me'", while Ben Rayner of the Toronto Star compared it to "Womanizer" (2008), saying both have "the same swaggering beat hits". Alexis Petridis of The Guardian gave the song a negative review, saying it "attempts to raise the kind of ire found on 'Blackout', but falls flat."

== Commercial performance ==
On the dated week of December 20, 2008, "Kill the Lights" debuted on several Billboard component charts based on digital downloads, while its parent album Circus topped the Billboard 200. In the United States, the song reached number sixty-nine on Pop 100, while reaching number seventy-two on Pop 100 Airplay. The song also debuted on the Bubbling Under Hot 100 Singles chart at number eleven. In Canada, "Kill the Lights" debuted on the Hot Digital Singles chart at number sixty-nine.

== Music video ==
An animated Spears surrounded by paparazzi in the music video

On February 10, 2009, a fan fiction contest was launched on Spears' official website. The winner of the contest would get to see their story becoming a plot for an official music video of a song. Later, it was revealed that Argentine Eliana Moyano had won the contest with her concept for "Kill the Lights" revealed on February 11, 2009, titled "Known Everywhere", while an exclusive preview was released on May 18, 2009. The animated music video, directed by PUNY, debuted on July 27, 2009, and was released for purchase via iTunes on September 4, 2009. The video begins with an animated Danja saying his introduction of the song, while paparazzi are in the background taking several pictures. Then, we see an animated Spears jumping into her rocket ship, flying and avoiding several paparazzi that are following her. She hides on another planet, turning all the lights of it on as she walks, and escaping the paparazzi that later appear to stalk her. However, Spears manages to avoid them, flying away into space in her rocket ship again, but this time exploding the planet and "killing all the lights" of it maneuvering a joystick.

== Usage in media ==
"Kill the Lights" was featured on the fourth season of MTV's The Hills, during a scene where Lauren Conrad and Lo Bosworth are talking about Heidi Montag while at the salon.

== Track listings ==
Cover of Circus Fantasy promo CD single (2009)

- Circus Fantasy promo CD single
1. "Circus" (Junior Vasquez Club Circus Mix) – 9:01
2. "Kill the Lights" – 3:59

== Credits and personnel ==
Credits for "Kill the Lights" are adapted from Circus liner notes.

Technical

- Produced for Danjahandz Productions.
- Recorded at Glenwood Place Studios in Burbank, California.
- Additional recording and audio mixing at Chalice Recording Studios in Los Angeles, California.
- Vocal production on behalf of Sunset Entertainment Group/Unlimited Inc.

Personnel

- Britney Spears — lead vocals, background vocals
- Nathaniel "Danja" Hills — producer, songwriting, background vocals
- Marcela "Ms. Lago" Araica — songwriting, mixing, vocal recording
- James Washington — songwriting, vocal production
- Luke Boyd — songwriting
- Jared Newcomb — assisted vocal recording
- Ron Taylor — Pro Tools editing

== Charts ==
Chart (2008)	Peak position
Canada Hot Digital Singles (Billboard)	69
US Bubbling Under Hot 100 Singles (Billboard)	11
US Billboard Pop 100	69
