= The Singles Collection (Britney Spears album) =

2009 greatest hits album by Britney Spears

- One-disc edition cover artwork (Note: The box set cover artwork does not feature Spears but a black background and a blue heart.)

Greatest hits album and box set by Britney Spears
- Released: November 10, 2009
- Recorded: 1997–July 2009
- Genre: Dance-pop
- Length: 60:58
- Label: RCA/Jive
- Producers: Jim Beanz; Benny Blanco; Bloodshy & Avant; Larry "Rock" Campbell; The Clutch; Dr. Luke; Danja; Keri Hilson; Rodney Jerkins; Brian Kierulf; David Kreuger; The Outsyders; Kristian Lundin; Steve Lunt; Penelope Magnet; Per Magnusson; Max Martin; The Neptunes; R. Kelly; Rami; J.R. Rotem; Josh Schwartz; Shellback; Guy Sigsworth; Trixster; Eric Foster White

Britney Spears chronology
Circus (2008)	The Singles Collection (2009)	Femme Fatale (2011)

Singles from The Singles Collection
- 1. "3" Released: September 29, 2009

The Singles Collection is the second greatest hits album by American singer Britney Spears. It was released on November 10, 2009, through Jive Records to commemorate her ten-year anniversary since entering the music industry. The compilation was released in many different formats, including a one-disc edition, a CD+DVD edition and a box set, which contained twenty-nine singles, each packaged in its own slip case with original cover art. The CD+DVD edition, as well as the box set, contains a DVD with Spears's music videos.

The Singles Collection received widespread acclaim from the music critics, who noted Spears's impact and influence on pop music during her first decade in the music industry. The album entered the top ten in Japan, and peaked at number twenty-two on the US Billboard 200. It is Spears' longest-charting album on the UK Albums Chart, due both to its initial chart run and resurgent success beginning in 2021.

"3" was released as the only single from the album. In the United States, it debuted atop the Billboard Hot 100. The only new song on the album, it was produced by Max Martin and Shellback.

== Release ==
On July 12, 2009, Spears confirmed through her Twitter account that she had begun recording new material, stating she was going into the studio with Swedish songwriter and producer Max Martin. On September 23, 2009, Jive Records officially announced the release of a greatest hits titled The Singles Collection through Spears's official website, in celebration of Spears's ten-year anniversary in the music industry. The album followed her previous greatest hits album Greatest Hits: My Prerogative (2004). The release date was confirmed to be November 24, 2009 and the album included a new song titled "3", produced by Martin. The compilation was available in two main editions, a standard edition as well as a box set. The standard version contained a single CD with seventeen tracks, including "3". The boxset contained her twenty-nine singles including "3", with each single packaged in its own slip case with original cover art, accompanied by an original b-side or remix. It also included a booklet featuring iconic images and facts about each track as well as a DVD featuring all of Spears's music videos to date in chronological order.

On October 14, 2009, Jive Records announced in a new press release that the date for the standard edition was moved up to November 10, 2009. The date for the release of the box set remained the same. The following day, a CD+DVD edition was announced to be released on November 10, 2009, outside North America. This edition included the standard edition track listing as well as the single "I'm Not a Girl, Not Yet a Woman".

== Singles ==
"3" was confirmed as the only single from the album, released on October 6, 2009, along with the announcement of The Singles Collection. It was released to radio stations on September 29, 2009. The song received positive reviews from critics, and debuted at number one on the US Billboard Hot 100, breaking many chart records. It made Spears the first artist in over three years to debut at the top position and the only non-American Idol artist in eleven years to do so. It was the sixteenth song in the chart history to debut at the top position and also the shortest title for a song reaching the top of the chart. "3" also debuted at number one in Canada and reached the top ten in Australia, Belgium (Wallonia), Czech Republic, Finland, France, Ireland, Norway, Sweden and the United Kingdom.

== Critical reception ==
Professional ratings
Review scores
Source	Rating
AllMusic	5/5 stars
Digital Spy	5/5 stars
IGN	8.2/10
PopMatters	6/10
Tom Hull – on the Web	A−

The compilation album received universal critical acclaim. Stephen Thomas Erlewine of AllMusic gave the collection five stars and compared it to Greatest Hits: My Prerogative, saying that although they had the same length, they were "different listening experiences". He also noted that the more recent tracks "help push The Singles away from teen pop and toward pure dance-pop bliss. [...] It does result in a stronger overall listen, since there are no slow patches here, just a parade of relentless hooks and rhythms that wound up defining the sound of a decade". Mayer Nissim of Digital Spy also gave the album five stars stating that "[it] perfectly captures the career of one of the best singles artists of the last ten years. Running from '...Baby One More Time' to 'Radar', you get a single-disc timeline that shows a progression in style and substance from school uniform-wearing pop ingénue to sultry motorik saucepot. [...] The only arguable weak link is the Madonna-featuring 'Me Against the Music', but in this context what once looked like a respectful passing of the baton now seems like an unconditional surrender of pop Queendom to its rightful heir." The reviewer also noted the impact on popular culture and pop music of Spears, highlighting "Oops!... I Did It Again", "Toxic" and "Stronger".

Brian Linder of IGN commented "2004's Greatest Hits: My Prerogative [...] captured the highlights from Britney's heyday, but lacks the more mature club-oriented material that she's churned out in recent years. That helps make this collection a justifiable fan purchase". Mike Diver of BBC Online called it "the definitive Britney album" and added that "these songs don't just make a mark, lingering in the memory – they are essential pieces of the past ten years of pop history, and deserve better than dismissal by so-called discerning listeners". Evan Sawdey of PopMatters called the album "a high-gloss collection of tunes that selectively sums up the career of one of the biggest female pop singers of the past decade. It's a disc that's light on filler [...] and heavy on Spears' more high-energy cuts, which, without question, play to her strengths as a performer".

== Commercial performance ==
In the United States, The Singles Collection debuted at number 22 on the Billboard 200, selling 26,800 copies in its first week. The album has sold over 250,000 copies in the United States. In Canada, the album was certified six times platinum by the Music Canada for sales over 480,000 copies. The album debuted at number 15 in Mexico and was certified gold by the Asociación Mexicana de Productores de Fonogramas y Videogramas (AMPROFON) for shipments over 30,000 units. On November 23, 2009, the album debuted on the Australian Albums Chart at number twenty-three. The same week, it debuted at number 22 in New Zealand. The album reached the top forty in Belgium (Wallonia), Denmark, Greece, New Zealand and Norway, and also charted in Belgium (Flanders), Finland, Spain and the Netherlands. In January 2011, The Singles Collection re-entered the charts in Ireland and the United Kingdom, at numbers 51 and 47, respectively.

In 2021, the album saw a resurgence in popularity on the UK Albums Chart, charting for 39 consecutive weeks throughout the year. Its resurgence in the United Kingdom has proven lasting, with the album continuing to regularly chart in subsequent years. In the week of June 27–July 3, 2024, the album made its 156th overall appearance on the UK Albums Chart, marking a cumulative three years of chart placement. It is Spears's longest-charting album on the UK Albums Chart, and one of only two albums by her to spend 100 or more weeks on that chart (the other being her debut, ...Baby One More Time). In the United Kingdom, it has been certified as double-platinum for more than 600,000 certified units.

== Track listing ==
=== Greatest hits ===
Standard edition
No.	Title	Writer(s)	Producer(s)	Length
1.	"3"	Max Martin; Shellback; Tiffany Amber	Martin; Shellback	3:25
2.	"...Baby One More Time" (from ...Baby One More Time, 1999)	Martin	Martin; Rami	3:31
3.	"(You Drive Me) Crazy" (The Stop Remix!) (from ...Baby One More Time, 1999)	Jörgen Elofsson; Per Magnusson; David Kreuger; Martin	Magnusson; Kreuger; Martin	3:17
4.	"Born to Make You Happy" (radio edit) (from ...Baby One More Time, 1999)	Andreas Carlsson; Kristian Lundin		3:35
5.	"Oops!... I Did It Again" (from Oops!... I Did It Again, 2000)	Martin; Rami	Martin; Rami	3:31
6.	"Stronger" (from Oops!... I Did It Again, 2000)	Martin; Rami	Martin; Rami	3:23
7.	"I'm a Slave 4 U" (from Britney, 2001)	Chad Hugo; Pharrell Williams	The Neptunes	3:25
8.	"Boys" (The Co-Ed Remix) (featuring Pharrell Williams) (from Britney, 2001)	Hugo; Williams	The Neptunes	3:46
9.	"Me Against the Music" (featuring Madonna) (from In the Zone, 2003)	Britney Spears; Madonna; Christopher "Tricky" Stewart; Thabiso "Tab" Nikhereanye; Penelope Magnet; Terius Nash; Gary O'Brien	Christopher "Tricky" Stewart; Magnet	3:45
10.	"Toxic" (from In the Zone, 2003)	Cathy Dennis; Christian Karlsson; Pontus Winnberg; Henrik Jonback	Bloodshy & Avant	3:20
11.	"Everytime" (from In the Zone, 2003)	Spears; Annette Stamatelatos	Guy Sigsworth	3:50
12.	"Gimme More" (from Blackout, 2007)	Nate Hills; James Washington; Keri Hilson; Marcella Araica	Danja; Jim Beanz; Hilson	4:11
13.	"Piece of Me" (from Blackout, 2007)	Karlsson; Winnberg; Klas Åhlund	Bloodshy & Avant	3:32
14.	"Womanizer" (from Circus, 2008)	Nikesha Briscoe; Rafael Akinyemi	The Outsyders	3:43
15.	"Circus" (from Circus, 2008)	Lukasz Gottwald; Claude Kelly; Benjamin Levin	Dr. Luke; Benny Blanco	3:11
16.	"If U Seek Amy" (from Circus, 2008)	Martin; Shellback; Savan Kotecha; Alexander Kronlund	Martin	3:36
17.	"Radar" (from Blackout, 2007 and Circus, 2008)	Karlsson; Winnberg; Jonback; Balewa Muhammad; Candice Nelson; Ezekiel "Zeke" Lewis; Patrick "J. Que" Smith	Bloodshy & Avant; The Clutch	3:48
Total length:				60:58

International bonus track
No.	Title	Writer(s)	Producer(s)	Length
8.	"I'm Not a Girl, Not Yet a Woman" (from Britney, 2001)	Martin; Rami; Dido	Martin; Rami	3:51
Total length:				64:49

iTunes Store bonus tracks
No.	Title	Writer(s)	Producer(s)	Length
19.	"Lucky" (from Oops!... I Did It Again, 2000)	Martin; Rami; Kronlund	Martin; Rami	3:24
20.	"Sometimes" (from ...Baby One More Time, 1999)	Elofsson	Magnusson; Kreuger; Elofsson	3:55
21.	"Overprotected" (from Britney, 2001)	Martin; Rami	Martin; Rami	3:18
22.	"Don't Let Me Be the Last to Know" (from Oops!... I Did It Again, 2000)	Robert John "Mutt" Lange; Shania Twain; Keith Scott	Lange	3:50
23.	"Break the Ice" (from Blackout, 2007)	Hills; Washington; Hilson; Araica	Danja; Jim Beanz	3:15
Total length:				81:01

Limited edition disc two (DVD)
No.	Title	Director(s)	Length
1.	"...Baby One More Time"	Nigel Dick	3:59
2.	"(You Drive Me) Crazy" (The Stop Remix!)	Dick	3:20
3.	"Born to Make You Happy"	Bille Woodruff	3:39
4.	"Oops!... I Did It Again"	Dick	4:12
5.	"Stronger"	Joseph Kahn	3:38
6.	"I'm a Slave 4 U"	Francis Lawrence	3:24
7.	"I'm Not a Girl, Not Yet a Woman"	Wayne Isham	3:49
8.	"Me Against the Music" (featuring Madonna)	Paul Hunter	4:03
9.	"Toxic"	Kahn	3:33
10.	"Everytime"	David LaChapelle	4:07
11.	"Gimme More"	Jake Sarfaty	4:01
12.	"Piece of Me"	Isham	3:10
13.	"Womanizer"	Kahn	3:46
14.	"Circus"	Lawrence	3:34
15.	"If U Seek Amy"	Jake Nava	3:46
16.	"Radar"	Dave Meyers	3:41
Total length:			60:18

=== Box set ===
Disc one
No.	Title	Writer(s)	Producer(s)	Length
1.	"...Baby One More Time"	Martin	Martin; Rami	3:30
2.	"Autumn Goodbye"	Eric Foster White	White	3:40

Disc two
No.	Title	Writer(s)	Producer(s)	Length
1.	"Sometimes" (Radio edit)	Elofsson	Magnusson; Kreuger; Elofson^{[a]}	3:55
2.	"I'm So Curious"	Spears; White	White	3:35

Disc three
No.	Title	Writer(s)	Producer(s)	Length
1.	"(You Drive Me) Crazy" (The Stop Remix!)	Elofsson; Magnusson; Kreuger; Martin	Martin; Rami	3:16
2.	"I'll Never Stop Loving You"	Jason Blume; Steve Diamond	Magnusson; Kreuger	3:41

Disc four
No.	Title	Writer(s)	Producer(s)	Length
1.	"Born to Make You Happy" (Radio edit)	Carlsson; Lundin	Lundin	3:35
2.	"Born to Make You Happy" (Bonus remix)	Carlsson; Lundin	Lundin	3:40

Disc five
No.	Title	Writer(s)	Producer(s)	Length
1.	"From the Bottom of My Broken Heart" (Radio Edit)	White	White	4:34
2.	"Thinkin' About You"	Mikey Bassie; White	White	3:35

Disc six
No.	Title	Writer(s)	Producer(s)	Length
1.	"Oops!... I Did It Again"	Martin; Rami	Martin; Rami	3:30
2.	"Deep in My Heart"	Magnusson; Kreuger; Carlsson	Magnusson; Kreuger	3:34

Disc seven
No.	Title	Writer(s)	Producer(s)	Length
1.	"Lucky"	Martin; Rami; Kronlund	Martin; Rami	3:24
2.	"Heart"	George Teren; Eugene Wilde	Steve Lunt; Larry "Rock" Campbell	3:00

Disc eight
No.	Title	Writer(s)	Producer(s)	Length
1.	"Stronger"	Martin; Rami	Martin; Rami	3:23
2.	"Walk on By"	Elofsson; Kreuger	Magnusson; Kreuger	3:34

Disc nine
No.	Title	Writer(s)	Producer(s)	Length
1.	"Don't Let Me Be the Last to Know"	Lange; Twain; Scott	Lange	3:50
2.	"Don't Let Me Be the Last to Know" (Hex Hector Radio Mix)	Lange; Twain; Scott	Lange; Hex Hector^{[c]}	3:50

Disc ten
No.	Title	Writer(s)	Producer(s)	Length
1.	"I'm a Slave 4 U"	Hugo; Williams	The Neptunes	3:23
2.	"Intimidated"	Spears; Rodney Jerkins; Josh Schwartz; Brian Kierulf	Jerkins	3:17

Disc eleven
No.	Title	Writer(s)	Producer(s)	Length
1.	"Overprotected"	Martin; Rami	Martin; Rami	3:19
2.	"Overprotected" (The Darkchild Remix)	Martin; Rami	Martin; Rami; Jerkins^{[c]}	3:18

Disc twelve
No.	Title	Writer(s)	Producer(s)	Length
1.	"I'm Not a Girl, Not Yet a Woman"	Martin; Rami; Dido	Martin; Rami	3:51
2.	"I Run Away"	Schwartz; Kierulf	Kierulf; Schwartz	4:05

Disc thirteen
No.	Title	Writer(s)	Producer(s)	Length
1.	"I Love Rock 'n' Roll"	Jake Hooker; Alan Merrill	Jerkins	3:05
2.	"I'm Not a Girl, Not Yet a Woman" (Metro Remix — Radio Edit)	Martin; Rami; Dido	Martin; Rami; Mark Taylor^{[c]}; Jeff Taylor^{[c]}	3:29

Disc fourteen
No.	Title	Writer(s)	Producer(s)	Length
1.	"Boys" (The Co-Ed Remix) (featuring Pharrell Williams of N.E.R.D.)	Hugo; Williams	The Neptunes	3:45
2.	"Boys" (Album version)	Hugo; Williams	The Neptunes	3:26

Disc fifteen
No.	Title	Writer(s)	Producer(s)	Length
1.	"Me Against the Music" (Video mix) (featuring Madonna)	Spears; Madonna; Stewart; Nikhereanye; Magnet; Nash; O'Brien	Trixster; Magnet^{[a]}	3:44
2.	"Me Against the Music" (Passengerz vs. the Club) (featuring Madonna)	Spears; Madonna; Stewart; Nikhereanye; Magnet; Nash; O'Brien	Trixster; Magnet^{[a]}; Sean Gill^{[c]}; Josh Harrison^{[c]}; Omar Galeano^{[c]}	7:34

Disc sixteen
No.	Title	Writer(s)	Producer(s)	Length
1.	"Toxic"	Dennis; Karlsson; Winnberg; Jonback	Bloodshy & Avant	3:19
2.	"Toxic" (Bloodshy & Avant's Intoxicated Remix)	Dennis; Karlsson; Winnberg; Jonback	Bloodshy & Avant	5:35

Disc seventeen
No.	Title	Writer(s)	Producer(s)	Length
1.	"Everytime"	Spears; Stamatelatos	Sigsworth	3:50
2.	"Everytime" (Above & Beyond's Club Mix)	Spears; Stamatelatos	Sigsworth; Jono Grant^{[c]}; Tony McGuinness^{[c]}; Paavo Siljamäki^{[c]}	8:46

Disc eighteen
No.	Title	Writer(s)	Producer(s)	Length
1.	"Outrageous"	R. Kelly	Kelly; Trixter^{[b]}; Magnet^{[b]}	3:20
2.	"Outrageous" (Junkie XL's Dancehall Mix)	Kelly	Kelly; Trixter^{[b]}; Magnet^{[b]}; Junkie XL^{[c]}	2:55

Disc nineteen
No.	Title	Writer(s)	Producer(s)	Length
1.	"My Prerogative"	Bobby Brown; Gene Griffin; Edward Teddy Riley	Bloodshy & Avant	3:34
2.	"My Prerogative" (Armand Van Helden Remix)	Brown; Griffin; Riley	Bloodshy & Avant; Armand Van Helden^{[c]}	7:48

Disc twenty
No.	Title	Writer(s)	Producer(s)	Length
1.	"Do Somethin'"	Karlsson; Winnberg; Jonback; Angela Hunte	Bloodshy & Avant	3:23
2.	"Do Somethin'" (Thick Vocal Mix)	Karlsson; Winnberg; Jonback; Hunte	Bloodshy & Avant; E Smoove aka Thick Dick^{[c]}	7:59

Disc twenty-one
No.	Title	Writer(s)	Producer(s)	Length
1.	"Someday (I Will Understand)"	Spears	Sigsworth	3:37
2.	"Mona Lisa"	Spears; Teddy Campbell; David Kochanski	Bloodshy & Avant	3:26

Disc twenty-two
No.	Title	Writer(s)	Producer(s)	Length
1.	"Gimme More"	Hills; Washington; Hilson; Araica	Danja; Beanz^{[b]}; Hilson^{[b]}	4:11
2.	"Gimme More" (Paul Oakenfold Mix)	Hills; Washington; Hilson; Araica	Danja; Beanz^{[b]}; Hilson^{[b]}; Paul Oakenfold^{[c]}	6:08

Disc twenty-three
No.	Title	Writer(s)	Producer(s)	Length
1.	"Piece of Me"	Karlsson; Winnberg; Åhlund	Bloodshy & Avant	3:31
2.	"Piece of Me" (Bloodshy & Avant's Böz O Lö Remix)	Karlsson; Winnberg; Åhlund	Bloodshy & Avant	4:53

Disc twenty-four
No.	Title	Writer(s)	Producer(s)	Length
1.	"Break the Ice"	Hills; Washington; Hilson; Araica	Danja; Beanz^{[b]}	3:16
2.	"Everybody"	J.R. Rotem; Evan "Kidd" Bogart; Annie Lennox; Dave Stewart	J.R. Rotem	3:16

Disc twenty-five
No.	Title	Writer(s)	Producer(s)	Length
1.	"Womanizer"	Briscoe; Akinyemi	The Outsyders	3:43
2.	"Womanizer" (Kaskade Remix)	Briscoe; Akinyemi	The Outsyders; Kaskade^{[c]}	5:31

Disc twenty-six
No.	Title	Writer(s)	Producer(s)	Length
1.	"Circus"	Gottwald; Kelly; Levin	Dr. Luke; Blanco	3:12
2.	"Circus" (Tom Neville's Ringleader Remix)	Gottwald; Kelly; Levin	Dr. Luke; Blanco; Tom Neville^{[c]}	7:52

Disc twenty-seven
No.	Title	Writer(s)	Producer(s)	Length
1.	"If U Seek Amy"	Martin; Shellback; Kotecha; Kronlund	Martin	3:37
2.	"If U Seek Amy" (Crookers Remix)	Martin; Shellback; Kotecha; Kronlund	Martin; Andrea Fratangelo^{[c]}; Francesco Barbaglia^{[c]}	4:29

Disc twenty-eight
No.	Title	Writer(s)	Producer(s)	Length
1.	"Radar"	Karlsson; Winnberg; Jonback; Muhammad; Nelson; Lewis; Smith	Bloodshy & Avant; The Clutch^{[a]}	3:49
2.	"Radar" (Bloodshy & Avant Remix)	Karlsson; Winnberg; Jonback; Muhammad; Nelson; Lewis; Smith	Bloodshy & Avant; The Clutch^{[a]}	5:43

Disc twenty-nine
No.	Title	Writer(s)	Producer(s)	Length
1.	"3"	Martin; Shellback; Amber	Martin; Shellback	3:33
2.	"3" (Groove Police Club Mix)	Martin; Shellback; Amber	Martin; Shellback; Matt Masurka^{[c]}	7:12

Disc thirty (DVD)
No.	Title	Director(s)	Length
1.	"...Baby One More Time"	Dick	3:59
2.	"Sometimes"	Dick	3:53
3.	"(You Drive Me) Crazy" (The Stop Remix!)	Dick	3:20
4.	"Born to Make You Happy"	Woodruff	3:39
5.	"From the Bottom of My Broken Heart"	Gregory Dark	4:30
6.	"Oops!... I Did It Again"	Dick	4:12
7.	"Lucky"	Meyers	4:08
8.	"Stronger"	Kahn	3:38
9.	"Don't Let Me Be the Last to Know"	Herb Ritts	3:52
10.	"I'm a Slave 4 U"	Lawrence	3:24
11.	"Overprotected" (The Darkchild Remix)	Chris Applebaum	3:35
12.	"I'm Not a Girl, Not Yet a Woman"	Isham	3:49
13.	"I Love Rock 'n' Roll"	Applebaum	3:07
14.	"Me Against the Music" (featuring Madonna)	Hunter	4:03
15.	"Toxic"	Kahn	3:33
16.	"Everytime"	LaChapelle	4:07
17.	"My Prerogative"	Nava	3:48
18.	"Do Somethin'"	Woodruff	3:22
19.	"Someday (I Will Understand)"	Michael Haussman	3:42
20.	"Gimme More"	Sarfaty	4:01
21.	"Piece of Me"	Isham	3:10
22.	"Break the Ice"	Robert Hales	3:21
23.	"Womanizer"	Kahn	3:46
24.	"Circus"	Lawrence	3:34
25.	"If U Seek Amy"	Nava	3:46
26.	"Radar"	Meyers	3:41
Total length:			97:54

=== Notes ===
- ^{^[a]} signifies a co-producer
- ^{^[b]} signifies a vocal producer
- ^{^[c]} signifies a remixer
- On the greatest hits album "I'm Not a Girl, Not Yet a Woman" is inserted into the existing track sequence, advancing all subsequent entries by one position without omitting any original songs.
- On the box set edition every disc is packaged in its own slip case with the original cover art.
- Streaming edition mirrors the track listing of the box set edition excluding disc thirty.

== Charts ==
=== Weekly charts ===
Weekly chart performance
Chart (2009–2021)	Peak position
Australian Albums (ARIA)	23
Belgian Albums (Ultratop Flanders)	50
Belgian Albums (Ultratop Wallonia)	23
Canadian Albums (Billboard)	19
Danish Albums (Hitlisten)	30
Dutch Albums (Album Top 100)	77
Finnish Albums (Suomen virallinen lista)	49
German Albums (Offizielle Top 100)	80
Greek Albums (IFPI)	40
Irish Albums (Official Charts)	24
Italian Albums (FIMI)	27
Japanese Albums (Oricon)	8
Japanese Top Albums Sales (Billboard Japan)	8
Mexican Albums (Top 100 Mexico)	15
New Zealand Albums (RMNZ)	22
Norwegian Albums (VG-lista)	36
Scottish Albums (Official Charts)	43
South Korean International Albums (Gaon)	11
Spanish Albums (Promusicae)	43
Swiss Albums (Schweizer Hitparade)	51
UK Albums (Official Charts)	38
US Billboard 200	22

=== Monthly charts ===
Chart (2010)	Peak position
South Korean International Albums (Gaon)	30

=== Year-end charts ===
Year-end chart performance
Chart	Year	Position
UK Albums (OCC)	2021	78
UK Albums (OCC)	2022	90
UK Albums (OCC)	2023	70
UK Albums (OCC)	2024	71
UK Albums (OCC)	2025	67

== Certifications and sales ==
Certifications and sales
Region	Certification	Certified units/sales
Australia (ARIA)	Gold	35,000^{‡}
Canada (Music Canada)	6× Platinum	480,000^{‡}
Japan	—	48,495
Mexico (AMPROFON)	Gold	30,000^{^}
New Zealand (RMNZ)	Gold	7,500^{‡}
United Kingdom (BPI)	2× Platinum	600,000^{‡}
United States	—	268,000
^{^} Shipments figures based on certification alone.^{‡} Sales+streaming figures based on certification alone.

== Release history ==
Release history
Region	Date	Edition(s)	Format(s)	Label(s)	Ref.
Canada	November 10, 2009	Standard	CD; digital download	Sony Music	
United States	November 10, 2009	Standard	CD; digital download	Jive	
Australia	November 13, 2009	Limited	CD+DVD	Sony Music	
Germany	November 20, 2009	Limited	CD+DVD	Sony Music	
Germany	November 20, 2009	Deluxe	29×CD+DVD	Sony Music	
Germany	November 20, 2009	Standard	CD; digital download	Sony Music	
United Kingdom	November 23, 2009	Standard	CD; digital download	RCA	
United Kingdom	November 23, 2009	Limited	CD+DVD	RCA	
United Kingdom	November 23, 2009	Deluxe	29×CD+DVD	RCA	
Canada	November 23, 2009	Deluxe	29×CD+DVD	Sony Music	
United States	November 23, 2009	Deluxe	29×CD+DVD	Jive	
Japan	November 25, 2009	Standard; limited	CD; CD+DVD	Sony Music Japan	
