= Circus (Britney Spears album) =

2008 studio album by Britney Spears

- Standard cover (Note: The deluxe edition cover features the red and blue colors of the frame in vice-versa.)

Studio album by Britney Spears
- Released: November 24, 2008 (Note: Circus was first released internationally, starting with Brazil on November 24, 2008, before being released in the United States on December 2, to coincide with Spears' birthday.)
- Recorded: November 8, 2006; (Note: "Radar" originally appeared on Spears' fifth studio album Blackout (2007), hence it was recorded earlier than the rest of Circus, being recorded on November 8, 2006 at the Sony Music Studios in New York City.) March–September 2008
- Studios: Chalice (Los Angeles); Conway (Los Angeles); Frou Frou Central (London); Glenwood Place (Burbank); Legacy (New York); Sony (New York); Sunset (Los Angeles); Train Tracks (Los Angeles); The Underlab (Los Angeles); Bloodshy & Avant (Stockholm); Maratone (Stockholm)
- Genres: Pop; dance
- Length: 46:15
- Label: Jive
- Producers: Benny Blanco; Bloodshy & Avant; The Clutch; Danja; Dr. Luke; Fernando Garibay; K. Briscoe/The Outsyders; Rob Knox; Greg Kurstin; Let's Go to War; Max Martin; Harvey Mason, Jr.; Guy Sigsworth

Britney Spears chronology
Blackout (2007)	Circus (2008)	The Singles Collection (2009)

Singles from Circus
- 1. "Womanizer" Released: September 26, 2008; 2. "Circus" Released: December 2, 2008; 3. "If U Seek Amy" Released: March 10, 2009; 4. "Radar" Released: June 22, 2009

Circus is the sixth studio album by American singer Britney Spears. It was released to coincide with her 27th birthday on December 2, 2008, by Jive Records. Transitioning from the "darker and more urban" themes of her fifth studio album Blackout (2007), Spears wanted to make her next project "a little bit lighter". She recorded much of the album between March and September 2008, after being involuntarily placed under a conservatorship earlier that year, following her highly publicized personal struggles in 2007. As executive producers, Larry Rudolph and Teresa LaBarbera Whites enlisted Spears' previous collaborators such as Max Martin, Bloodshy & Avant, Guy Sigsworth and Danja, as well as new ones, including Dr. Luke, Benny Blanco and Claude Kelly. Their efforts resulted in a primarily pop and dance record, whose lyrical themes addressed fame, infidelity, and infatuation.

Deemed Spears' comeback record, Circus received generally favorable reviews from music critics upon its release; the production was complimented but lyrical content and Spears' vocal performance were met with ambivalence. A global commercial success, the album debuted atop the US Billboard 200 with first-week sales of 505,000 copies, becoming her fifth number-one album. Since then, it has been certified triple platinum by the Recording Industry Association of America (RIAA). By 2009, the album had sold over four million copies worldwide. At the 52nd Annual Grammy Awards, its lead single "Womanizer" was nominated for Best Dance Recording.

Circus produced four singles. "Womanizer" debuted at number 96 on the US Billboard Hot 100 and ascended to the top spot in its second week, registering the largest leap on the chart at the time. It became Spears' best-selling single in the country since her debut "...Baby One More Time" (1998). "Circus" debuted and peaked at number three on the Billboard Hot 100; consequently, Circus became Spears' first album since her debut ...Baby One More Time (1999) to have two US top-ten singles. Subsequent singles "If U Seek Amy" and "Radar" peaked at numbers 19 and 88 on the Billboard Hot 100, respectively. To further promote the album, Spears embarked on the world tour The Circus Starring Britney Spears (2009).

== Background and development ==
Throughout 2007, Spears' professional endeavors were tremendously overshadowed by her personal struggles, including the aftermath of her vigorous partying and suffering from a nervous breakdown, during which she shaved her head to intense media scrutiny. Despite the difficulties, Spears released her fifth studio album Blackout–considered her best and most influential work by numerous critics–in October. However, it became her first studio album not to debut atop the US Billboard 200–debuting at number two–but nevertheless produced "Gimme More", Spears' first Billboard Hot 100 top-three hit since her debut "...Baby One More Time" (1998). Upon its release, Spears' publicized behavior began clashing with her image; Stephen Thomas Erlewine of AllMusic said the album served as a soundtrack "for Britney's hazy, drunken days, reflecting the excess that's splashed all over the tabloids", while noting that the album had a coherence that the public Spears lacked.

In January 2008, Spears refused to relinquish custody of her sons to her ex-husband Kevin Federline's representatives. She was subsequently hospitalized at Cedars-Sinai Medical Center after police that had arrived at her house noted she appeared to be under the influence of an unidentified substance. The following day, Spears's visitation rights were suspended at an emergency court hearing, and Federline was given sole physical and legal custody of their sons. She was committed to the psychiatric ward of Ronald Reagan UCLA Medical Center and put on 5150 involuntary psychiatric hold under California state law. The court placed her under a conservatorship led by her father Jamie Spears and attorney Andrew Wallet, giving them complete control of her assets. She was released five days later, while the conservatorship would not be terminated until November 2021, following Spears' highly publicized battle against her father and others involved in the conservatorship. Soon after being placed under the conservatorship, work on Spears' sixth studio album commenced. Consequently, the release of "Radar" as the fourth single from Blackout was canceled so Spears could focus on Circus.

== Recording and production ==
"Once [Dr. Luke] and I were in the studio, he played me the music he was working on for [Britney], and we then based the song on what her life was like at the time and how people viewed her. It was a cool way to get people dancing and having fun, but also to have a slight message underneath of it all."

— Producer Claude Kelly talks about the development, content and concept of Circus.

In July 2008, it was confirmed that Spears was in the process of recording her sixth studio album. "Radar" was originally included on Spears' fifth studio album Blackout (2007), and was recorded on November 8, 2006, the day after Spears filed for divorce from Kevin Federline, at the Sony Music Studios in New York City. Alongside the announcement of Circus came the additional confirmation of the involvement of producers Sean Garrett, Guy Sigsworth, Danja and Bloodshy & Avant. During its development, Garrett and vocal producer Jim Beanz complimented Spears's work ethic after her much-publicized personal struggles the previous year. Spears co-wrote four tracks on the album and worked to develop a more pop-influenced record with collaborators she had worked with earlier in her career. She stated that Circus marked the longest time she had spent recording an album, adding: "I think it is more urban [...] I'm writing every day, right here at the piano in this living room" and also described the album as her best work to date.

Producer Claude Kelly discussed the initial lack of concept for Circus, saying: "When I went in with [Dr. Luke] we knew we were going to maybe write something for [Britney], but there was no concept, it was just knowing her style and knowing what she does. Max Martin, who frequently collaborated with Spears on her first three studio albums ...Baby One More Time (1999), Oops!... I Did It Again (2000) and Britney (2001), wrote and produced "If U Seek Amy". The Outsyders, an Atlanta-based production team, produced the lead single "Womanizer", while Fernando Garibay worked on "Amnesia" and "Quicksand", neither of which made the standard edition track listing. Danja reported that he worked on tracks at the Chalice Recording Studios in Los Angeles, while Spears recorded them at the Glenwood Place Studios in Burbank, California. Canadian trio Let's Go to War co-wrote and produced the track "Mmm Papi". Guy Sigsworth, with whom Spears had previously collaborated with for her single "Everytime", produced two songs on the album: the ballads "My Baby" and "Out from Under", the latter of which is a cover song first performed by Joanna Pacitti for the soundtrack to the 2007 film Bratz. Lil Jon, Rodney Jerkins, Sean Garrett, and Taio Cruz announced they were working with Spears, though their songs were not included on the final track listing.

== Music and lyrics ==
"Circus is a little bit lighter than Blackout. I think a lot of the songs I did at that time, I was going through a really dark phase in my life, so a lot of the songs reflect that. [...] But they're two totally different vibes. Blackout is a little bit more darker and edgier, and a little bit more urban."

— Spears comparing Circus to Blackout

Circus is predominantly a pop and dance record, described as a sequel to Spears' fifth studio album Blackout (2007). Spears described the album as "lighter" than the urban-oriented Blackout. The album has been compared to the works of Janet Jackson, Eurythmics, and New Order, as well as the songwriting of Prince, Leiber & Stoller and Phil Spector. It incorporates lyrical themes previously acknowledged in Spears' work: "Circus" and "Kill the Lights" discuss fame, much like "Piece of Me" (2007), while "Womanizer" and "Shattered Glass" talk about a womanizing man. Circus opens with its lead single "Womanizer", which features synth sirens with a repetitive chorus, and lyrically discusses a cheating man; it was described by Spears as a "girl anthem". "Circus" addresses her feelings as an entertainer and performing, highlighted in the lines "All eyes on me in the centre of the ring just like a circus / When I crack that whip everybody gonna trip just like a circus". Its electronic dance elements were compared by PopJustice to those of Spears' earlier single "Break the Ice" (2008). The ballad "Out from Under" incorporates acoustic guitar backings, while "Kill the Lights" is a dance-pop track speaking about Spears's conflict with paparazzi. "Shattered Glass" utilizes dark electronic beats and details a non-repairable relationship. "If U Seek Amy" integrates "glam-rave" elements with traditional pop styles; it gained controversy for its double entendre, where the title sounds phonetically like "F-U-C-K me".

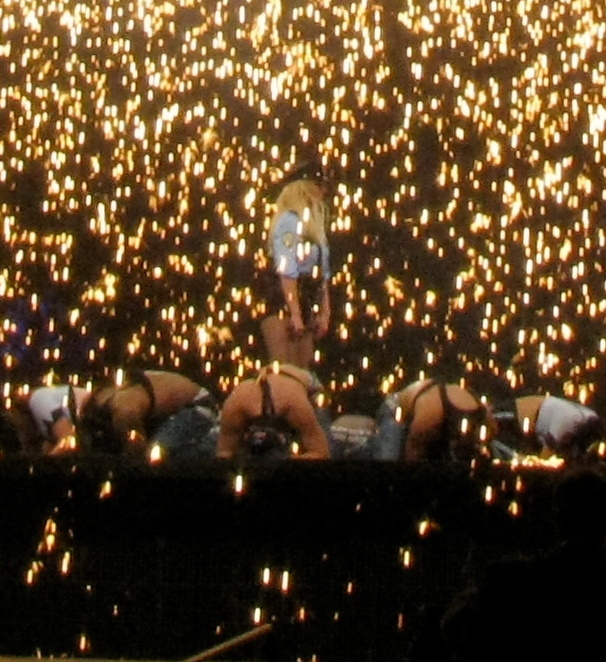
Spears performing "Womanizer" during the Circus Starring Britney Spears in 2009

The electropop track "Unusual You" deals with a woman finding unexpected love. It has been compared to musical themes from the 1980s and 1990s, and has been noted as a "pulsating ballad", with the song also drawing comparisons to the "shimmering waterfall mood first popularized by Janet Jackson". "Blur", which features Spears singing in a lower register, sees the inclusion of urban influences, and lyrically recalls the morning after a party: "Can't remember what I did last night/I gotta get my head right, where the hell am I? Who are you? What'd we do last night?"; it drew similarities to Spears' song "Early Mornin" from In the Zone (2003). "Mmm Papi" draws elements from a 1960s go-go rock guitar, as well as Latin pop and dancehall themes. Despite its "fun" nature, it was criticized for appearing to "revisit the Lolita persona of "...Baby One More Time". It has been suggested that its lyrics deal with either Spears' father Jamie or paparazzo and Spears' ex-boyfriend Adnan Ghalib. "Mannequin" is a trip hop-influenced dance-pop track; while being noted for its "risky" and "futuristic" nature, it has also been suggested that Spears' vocals sound "lifeless". "Lace and Leather" is an electro-funk track which gained comparisons to "Control era Janet Jackson", Prince, and Vanity 6's works from the 1980s, and featured a then-unknown Kesha as a backing vocalist. "My Baby", described as having a "faux-Janet Jackson vocal", was written by Spears about her two sons Sean Preston and Jayden James Federline. Circus closes with its bonus track "Radar", an electropop and Eurodisco song featuring distorted synthesizers emulating sonar pulses, which received comparisons to those of Soft Cell's "Tainted Love" (1981). In its lyrics, Spears lets the subject know he is on her radar, while she lists the qualities the man has.

== Title and packaging ==
Spears commented on the title of Circus: "I like the fact that you're always on the edge of your seat when you're at a circus. You're never bored [...] You're just really engulfed in what's going on around you. And you want to know what's going to happen next." Spears also revealed she titled the album Circus due to her life being "a circus" at the time. The album's cover artwork and booklet images were photographed by Kate Turning and feature Spears in circus-styled settings. Spears revealed the album's cover alongside its track listing via her official website on October 31, 2008.

== Release and promotion ==
In September 2008, it was announced Circus would be released on December 2, Spears' 27th birthday; it shared its release date with the similarly titled album The Circus by British group Take That. However, following unauthorized online leaks, imeem began streaming Circus on November 24. To promote the album, Jive Records set up a hotline where fans could leave a message for Spears, some of which received a return phone call from her. Some songs were previewed through the website of the New York radio station WKTU and Amazon. MTV aired a 90-minute documentary Britney: For the Record on November 30, documenting her return. In February 2009, Jive's official website held the "Global Fan-Fiction Contest", which required participants to submit a 200-word story based on one of the album's tracks. The public was allowed to vote for their favorite short story, which would be produced into an animated music video. The winning story was based on the song "Kill the Lights", and the video premiered on July 27.

Spears' live comeback and promotional activities for Circus began on November 6, 2008, with a cameo appearance at the Dodger Stadium show of Madonna's Sticky & Sweet Tour (2008–2009). Midway through the performance of "Human Nature", Spears joined Madonna on stage. The week prior to the album's release, Spears performed in several countries as a part of the Circus Promo Tour. On November 27, Spears performed "Womanizer" live at the 2008 Bambi Awards in Offenburg, Germany, where she received an award for Best International Pop Star. In addition, she performed the song on Star Academy in France the following day and on The X Factor in the United Kingdom on November 29. Her performance on The X Factor was watched by an average of 11,880,000 citizens in the UK. Spears premiered the second single "Circus" alongside "Womanizer" at the Big Apple Circus on Good Morning America on December 2. On December 16, she performed on Nippon TV's Best Artist of 2008.

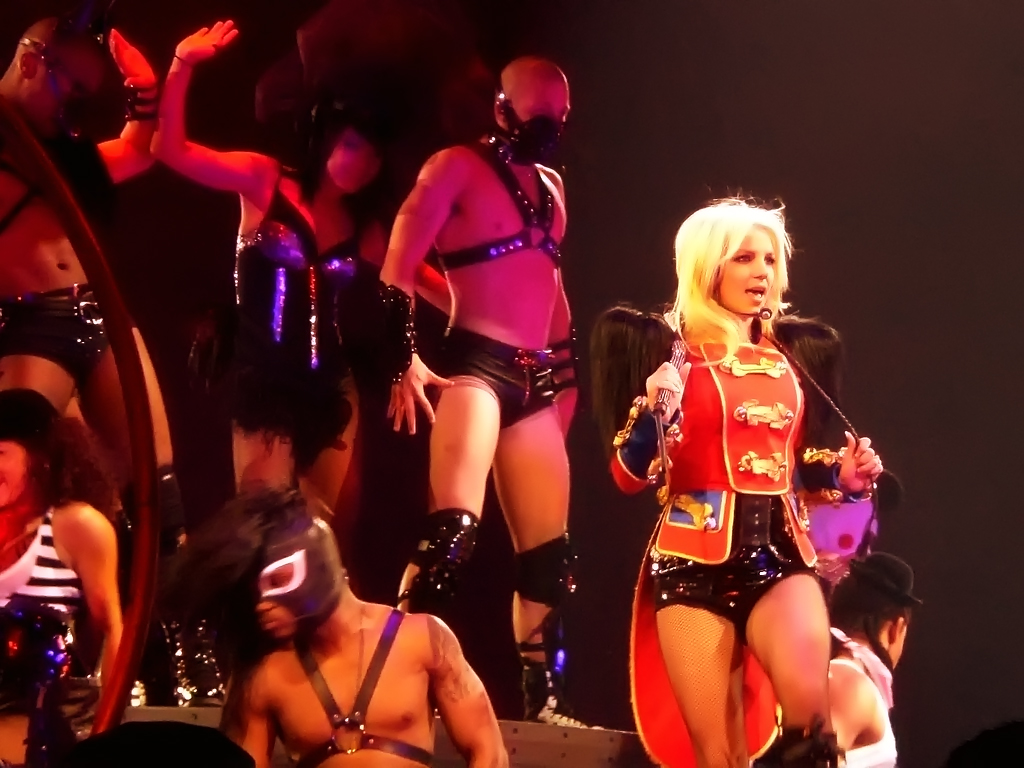
Spears performing "Circus" during the Circus Starring Britney Spears in 2009

While performing on Good Morning America on December 2, Spears announced her fifth worldwide concert tour, titled The Circus Starring Britney Spears. She initially revealed the first leg of 25 dates in the United States and two in the United Kingdom. Her longtime manager Larry Rudolph stated that the tour would "blow people's minds and promises to show Britney's fans something they will never forget", later adding: "she goes full-speed the whole show — about an hour and a half. It's pretty intense. This is a full-blown, full-out Britney Spears show, It is everything everybody expects from her — and more!". Spears also expressed excitement in including songs from Blackout into the setlist, as she did not tour to promote it. The tour commenced on March 3, 2009, in New Orleans' New Orleans Arena and finished on November 29, in Adelaide's Adelaide Entertainment Centre. The tour consisted of four legs: two in North America, one in Europe and one in Oceania. The stage was composed of three rings and set in-the-round to resemble an actual circus. Fashion designers Dean and Dan Caten created the costumes. A giant cylinder screen was set above the stage to showcase videos and backdrops. Effects were provided by Solotech. The setlist was composed generally from her albums In the Zone (2003), Blackout and Circus. In June, Spears announced she would tour Australia for the first time; she was also rumored to tour South America, though her manager Adam Leber denied this despite their efforts to do so.

Controversy arose during the Australian leg of the tour after several fans walked out of the performances due to Spears' alleged lip-synching; such claims were later denied by Spears' management and promoters. The tour was ranked as the fourth highest-grossing tour of the year in North America, becoming the highest-grossing tour of the year by a solo artist. In February 2010, Pollstar released their Top 50 Worldwide Concert Tours of 2009; the Circus Starring Britney Spears was ranked as the world's fifth highest-grossing tour of the year, with a gross of $131.8 million. In May 2010, Hollyscoop ranked the tour at number five on their "15 Most Profitable Female Tours Ever" list.

== Singles ==
"Womanizer"
The pre-chorus of "Womanizer", in which the title is repeated eight times.

"Womanizer" was released as the lead single from Circus on September 26, 2008. The song was met with positive response from critics, who complimented its hook and empowering lyrics, deeming it a return of form and a "comeback" single for Spears. It debuted at number 96 on the US Billboard Hot 100 before leaping to the summit the following week, breaking the record for the largest leap on the chart. (Note: Kelly Clarkson broke the record three months later with "My Life Would Suck Without You" (2009), which registered a 97–1 leap in its second week.) The song has sold over 3,500,000 digital downloads in the United States. Internationally, it reached number one in Belgium, Canada, Croatia, Denmark, Finland, France, Israel, Norway, Sweden and Turkey, and on the European Hot 100 Singles. At the 52nd Annual Grammy Awards (2010), the song was nominated for Best Dance Recording. Its accompanying music video premiered on October 18, as a spiritual sequel to "Toxic" (2004); both videos were directed by Joseph Kahn. It portrays Spears as a woman who disguises herself in different costumes and follows her boyfriend through his daily activities to expose him in the end. The video won Best Pop Video and was nominated for Video of the Year at the 2009 MTV Video Music Awards. "Womanizer" remains one of Spears' biggest hits and has been covered by numerous other artists.

"Circus" was released as the second single from Circus on December 2, 2008. It debuted and peaked at number three on the US Billboard Hot 100. The song has sold over 3,200,000 digital downloads in the US. Internationally, it peaked atop the Türkiye Top 20 and within the top ten in Australia, Bulgaria, Canada, Denmark, Hungary, Israel, New Zealand, Scotland and Sweden. Its Francis Lawrence-directed accompanying music video portrays Spears as a ringleader of a circus accompanied by different performers, and features scenes of Spears in different circus settings. The video received positive reviews from critics, but was criticized for featuring "cruelly trained animals"; however, those claims were dismissed. It won a Best Video award on Fuse TV, and was nominated for three MTV Video Music Awards in 2009.

"If U Seek Amy" was released as the third single from Circus on March 10, 2009. Due to the song's double entendre in the chorus, the Parents Television Council (PTC) threatened to file indecency complaints with the Federal Communications Commission (FCC) against any station that played the song between 6 a.m. and 10 p.m. A clean edit of the song, titled "If U See Amy", was later sent to radio by Jive Records. The song peaked at number 19 on the US Billboard Hot 100, making Circus Spears' first album since ...Baby One More Time to produce three top-20 singles. Internationally, it peaked atop the Brasil Hot 100 Airplay, whilst reaching the top ten in Belgium, Israel, Malaysia and Mexico. Its Jake Nava-directed accompanying music video was released on March 12, and depicts Spears poking fun at American culture.

"Radar" was originally included on Spears' fifth studio album Blackout (2007) and set to be released as its fourth single. However, its release was canceled when Spears began work on Circus. "Radar" was later included on Circus and officially released as its fourth and final single on June 5, 2009. The song originally entered the US Digital Songs at number 52 due to digital downloads from Blackout. After being confirmed as a single, entered the US Billboard Hot 100 at number 90, peaking at number 88 the following week; it became Spears' lowest-peaking US-released single on the chart. Its Dave Meyers-directed accompanying music video portrays Spears as an aristocrat at a polo mansion, who's involved in a love triangle with two polo players.

Despite not being released as singles, several tracks from Circus appeared on Billboard's component charts upon its release. "Shattered Glass", peaked at number 70 on the US Billboard Hot 100, higher than the released single "Radar". It additionally peaked at number 29 on the US Digital Songs and number 75 on the Canadian Hot 100. The song also entered the US Pop 100 chart, peaking at number 57. "Lace and Leather" and "Mmm Papi" peaked at numbers 84 and 94 on the Pop 100, respectively. "Out from Under" debuted at number 40 on the Swedish Singles Chart on August 14, 2009, reaching number 32 the following week and staying on the chart for five weeks.

== Critical reception ==
Professional ratings
Aggregate scores
Source	Rating
AnyDecentMusic?	6.1/10
Metacritic	64/100
Review scores
Source	Rating
AllMusic	3/5 stars
Entertainment Weekly	B
The Guardian	3/5 stars
The Independent	2/5 stars
Los Angeles Times	2/4 stars
NME	5/10
Robert Christgau	(2-star Honorable Mention)
Rolling Stone	3.5/5 stars
Slant Magazine	3/5 stars
USA Today	3/4 stars

Upon its release, Circus received generally favorable reviews from music critics. At Metacritic, which assigns a normalized rating out of 100 to reviews from mainstream critics, Circus received an average score of 64, based on 22 reviews, indicating "generally favorable reviews". Stephen Thomas Erlewine provided a favorable review, describing it as a "friendly remake of the hedonistic Blackout", but preferred its predecessor for being more "sleek or addictive" than Circus. Genevieve Koski of The A.V. Club appreciated that Spears appeared to "put some real effort into her Circus performances", rather than seeming "flat-sounding" as she felt Blackout had. Writing for Digital Spy, Nick Levine opined that Spears "sounds more confident" than she had on Blackout. While Chris Willman from Entertainment Weekly appreciated the overall production of Circus, he was critical of Spears' recently established pattern of "putting out albums with titles that promise more self-revelation than she's ultimately able to provide." Robert Christgau gave Circus a two-star honorable mention, stating that it was "still fun more often than not". Jon Pareles of The New York Times expressed his enjoyment of the "crisp" material that incorporated "catchy melodic interludes". Caryn Ganz from Rolling Stone opined that the "clubby, adventurous pop" included on the album could have been a satisfactory successor to her fourth studio album In the Zone (2003).

Writing for USA Today, Steve Jones applauded Spears for being "resilient" and "[knowing] who she is as a singer" and not "[wasting] time searching for artistic direction or overthinking her appeal." The Village Voice considered Circus "no better or worse than Janet Jackson's dominatrix-lite Discipline." Alexis Petridis of The Guardian gave a more mixed review, suggesting that Spears "frequently sounds disconnected, even a bit bored" throughout the record, whereas Blackout was a "relentless, risky album made by a woman whose obituary was apparently being prepared by Associated Press." A writer for The Independent gave a negative review, opining that Spears' vocal delivery sounded emotionless in mid-tempo and ballad-paced tracks. Slant Magazine's Eric Henderson shared a similar sentiment, suggesting that the album's "self-actualization" gave off a "hollow" feel through the majority of the record. Ann Powers from Los Angeles Times felt that Circus served as a "bang-up job" of stating that "Spears is still a young woman trying to manage an impossible situation." Writing for NME, Hamish MacBain was disappointed that "Spears is quite simply rubbish at being sexy", adding that Circus is the "umpteenth attempt to turn the perceived chaos of Britney's transition to adulthood – she's 27 next week! – into sleazy, raunchy, dirrty adult-pop product."

== Accolades ==
=== Awards and nominations ===
Awards and nominations for Circus
Year	Award	Category	Nominee(s)	Result	Ref.
2008	Virgin Media Music Awards	Best Album	Circus	Runner-up	
2009	Bravo A-list Awards	A-list Album	Circus	Won	
2009	Hungarian Music Awards	Foreign Dance-Pop Album of the Year	Circus	Nominated	
2009	NME Awards	Worst Album	Circus	Nominated	
2009	Premios Oye!	English Album of the Year	Circus	Nominated	
2010	Juno Award	International Album of the Year	Circus	Nominated	

=== Listings ===
Listings
Year	Publication	List	Position	Ref.
2008	Billboard	Readers' Choice – Best Album of 2008	1	
2008	IFPI Switzerland Top 100 Albums of 2008	Best Album of 2008	1	

== Commercial performance ==
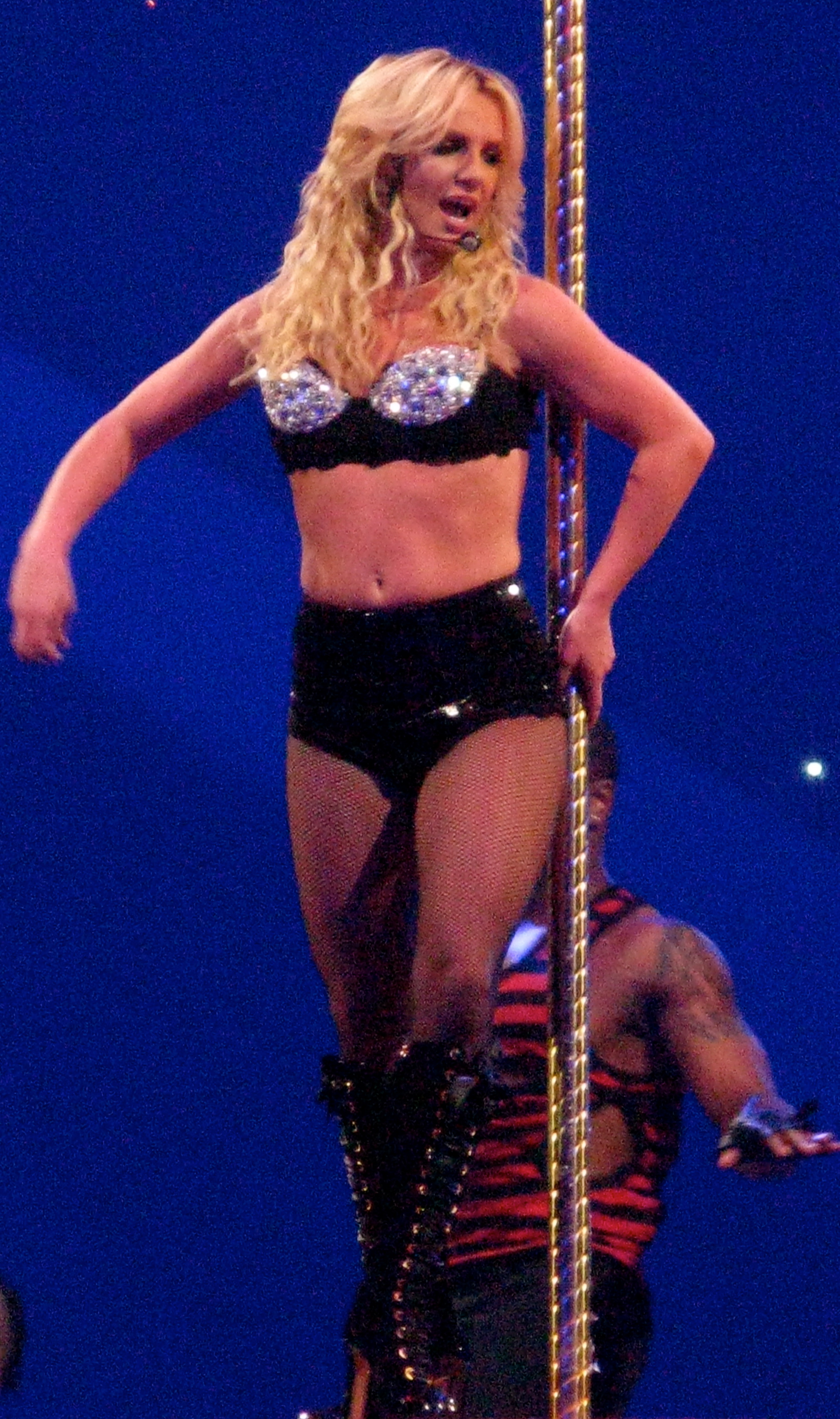
Spears performing "Radar" during the Circus Starring Britney Spears in 2009

In the United States, Circus debuted atop the Billboard 200, with first-week sales of over 505,000 copies. It registered the second biggest debut-week sales of 2008 for a female artist, only behind Taylor Swift's Fearless. The album spent nine weeks within the top ten, making it Spears's longest-running top-ten album since Oops!... I Did It Again (2000), which spent 23 weeks inside the top ten. It was certified platinum by the Recording Industry Association of America (RIAA) on January 29, 2009. The album placed sixth on the year-end Billboard 200 for 2009. According to Nielsen SoundScan, the album had sold 1.7 million copies in the US by March 2015. With over 51,000 units sold in its first week, the album opened atop the Canadian Albums Chart; it marked her highest first-week sales in Canada since Oops!... I Did It Again, which sold 95,000 copies. In less than a month, it became the ninth best-selling album of 2008 in the country, selling 143,000 copies, and one of the top ten best-selling digital albums of the year with over 10,100 downloads. In March 2009, the album was certified triple platinum by the Canadian Recording Industry Association (CRIA). In Mexico, Circus debuted atop the international album chart and at number three on Top 100 Mexico, selling over 46,000 copies and being certified gold by the Asociación Mexicana de Productores de Fonogramas y Videogramas (AMPROFON) in its first week.

Across Oceania, Circus was a top-ten success, peaking at number three in Australia and number six in New Zealand. It was later certified double platinum by the Australian Recording Industry Association (ARIA) and platinum by the Recording Industry Association of New Zealand (RIANZ). In Japan, the album peaked at number five on the Oricon Albums Chart and was certified gold by the Recording Industry Association of Japan (RIAJ). In the United Kingdom, Circus debuted and peaked at number four on the UK Albums Chart, spending 31 weeks on the chart, and at number seven on the Scottish Albums Chart. The album was certified platinum by the British Phonographic Industry (BPI). In France, the album sold 18,319 copies in its first two days, debuting at number five. Across Europe, it peaked at the summit in Russia, Switzerland, the international album chart in Greece, and the European Top 100 Albums. Furthermore, the album reached the top ten in Austria, Belgium, Denmark, France, Germany, Ireland, Italy, the Netherlands and Spain. By September 2009, Circus had sold over four million copies worldwide.

== Controversies ==
"There is no misinterpreting the lyrics to this song, and it's certainly not about a girl named Amy. It's one thing for a song with these lyrics to be included on a CD so that fans who wish to hear it can do so, but it's an entirely different matter when this song is played over the publicly-owned airwaves, especially at a time when children are likely to be in the listening audience."

— PTC's president Tim Water on the controversy over "If U Seek Amy" lyrics.

Circus and endeavors during its promotional campaign were subjects of various controversies. Controversy first arose on December 5, 2008, when Australian music site Undercover.com.au reported a complaint on the lyrical content of "If U Seek Amy" from Leonie Barsenbach, a housewife from Sydney, who stated: "I was astonished and totally taken aback when I heard my 5 and 7-year-old kids walking around the house singing 'F-U-C-K' ... When I asked them what it was, they told me it was Britney Spears. I was horrified. I got them the Circus album but there was no warning on it ... It is extremely offensive. I feel deceived." Rolling Stone writer Daniel Kreps defended Spears, arguing that parents should have been aware of her lyrical themes. After the song was announced as the third single from the album in January 2009, American radio stations were unsure about playing it due to its double entendre in the chorus; WFLZ-FM produced their own edit of the song, titled "If U See Amy". Shortly after, the Parents Television Council (PTC) threatened to file indecency complaints with the Federal Communications Commission (FCC) against any station that played the song between 6 a.m. and 10 p.m. RBR.com reported that "interestingly, Circus was reviewed by Common Sense Media, another organization whose mission is to help parents manage their children's media consumption. It rated it appropriate for age 13 and up, but made no specific mention of 'If U Seek Amy'. Even more interestingly, reputed incoming FCC Chair Julius Genachowski is a founding board member of Common Sense."

The accompanying music video for the title track of Circus caused further controversy due to its use of exotic animals. On December 9, 2008, animal rights organization People for the Ethical Treatment of Animals (PETA) issued a press release condemning Spears for using "cruelly trained lions and elephants" and demanding her to "stop using exotic animals in her videos and concerts once and for all". Spears had previously received criticism from the organization when she used an albino python and a caged tiger during a performance of "I'm a Slave 4 U" at the 2001 MTV Video Music Awards. Kari Johnson from Have Trunk Will Travel responded by saying: "[the company] has never issued a written endorsement, nor does it condone using electrical devices to discipline and control elephants except in situations where elephant or human safety is at risk. [...] The American Humane Association monitors animal action in film and television. A representative was on the set of the Britney Spears 'Circus' video with our elephants, Tai and Kitty, to ensure their safety and welfare [...] Britney, the director, producers and the entire crew were respectful of the elephants' needs and comfort and a pleasure to work with."

The Australian leg of the album's accompanying tour the Circus Starring Britney Spears caused controversy following its opening show in Perth on November 6, 2009, when The Advertiser writer Rebekah Devlin reported that a number of fans had walked out of the show; they were apparently "disappointed" and "outraged" regarding Spears' lip syncing and subdued dancing. Australian tour promoter Paul Dainty denied the allegations, while Spears' manager responded via his Twitter account by saying: "It's unfortunate that one journalist in Perth didn't enjoy the show last night. Fortunately the other 18,272 fans in attendance did"; Spears' official website also posted a list of positive reviews from a number of fans.

== Track listing ==
Circus
No.	Title	Writer(s)	Producer(s)	Length
1.	"Womanizer"	Nikesha Briscoe; Rafael Akinyemi	K. Briscoe/The Outsyders	3:43
2.	"Circus"	Lukasz Gottwald; Claude Kelly; Benjamin Levin	Dr. Luke; Benny Blanco	3:12
3.	"Out from Under"	Shelly Peiken; Arnthor Birgisson; Wayne Hector	Guy Sigsworth	3:54
4.	"Kill the Lights"	Nathaniel Hills; James Washington; Luke Boyd; Marcella Araica	Danja; Jim Beanz^{[a]}	3:59
5.	"Shattered Glass"	Gottwald; Kelly; Levin	Dr. Luke; Blanco; Kelly^{[a]}	2:53
6.	"If U Seek Amy"	Max Martin; Shellback; Savan Kotecha; Alexander Kronlund	Martin	3:37
7.	"Unusual You"	Christian Karlsson; Pontus Winnberg; Henrik Jonback; Kasia Livingston	Bloodshy & Avant	4:23
8.	"Blur"	Hills; Stacy Barthe; Araica	Danja	3:09
9.	"Mmm Papi"	Britney Spears; Henry Walter; Adrien Gough; Peter-John Kerr; Nicole Morier	Let's Go to War; Morier^{[a]}	3:22
10.	"Mannequin"	Spears; Harvey Mason, Jr.; Rob Knox; James Fauntleroy II	Mason, Jr.; Rob Knox	4:06
11.	"Lace and Leather"	Gottwald; Levin; Frankie Storm; Ronnie Jackson	Dr. Luke; Blanco^{[b]}	2:48
12.	"My Baby"	Spears; Sigsworth	Sigsworth	3:20
13.	"Radar" (bonus track)	Karlsson; Winnberg; Jonback; Balewa Muhammad; Candice Nelson; Ezekiel "Zeke" Lewis; Patrick "J. Que" Smith	Bloodshy & Avant; The Clutch^{[b]}	3:49
Total length:				46:15

International digital edition
No.	Title	Writer(s)	Producer(s)	Length
14.	"Rock Boy"	Hills; Araica; Tina Parol-Gemza; Michael Shimshack	Danja	3:21
Total length:				49:36

Japanese and UK editions
No.	Title	Writer(s)	Producer(s)	Length
14.	"Amnesia"	Fernando Garibay; Livingston	Garibay	3:57
Total length:				50:12

Deluxe edition
No.	Title	Writer(s)	Producer(s)	Length
14.	"Rock Me In"	Spears; Greg Kurstin; Morier	Kurstin; Morier^{[a]}	3:17
15.	"Phonography"	Karlsson; Winnberg; Jonback; Muhammad; Nelson; Lewis; Smith	Bloodshy & Avant; The Clutch	3:35
Total length:				53:07

US iTunes Store deluxe edition pre-order
No.	Title	Writer(s)	Producer(s)	Length
16.	"Trouble"	Karlsson; Winnberg; Jonback; Muhammad; Nelson; Lewis; Smith	Bloodshy & Avant; The Clutch	3:34
Total length:				56:41

European iTunes Store deluxe edition
No.	Title	Writer(s)	Producer(s)	Length
16.	"Quicksand"	Lady Gaga; Garibay	Garibay	4:05
Total length:				57:12

=== Notes ===
- ^{^[a]} signifies a vocal producer
- ^{^[b]} signifies a co-producer
- "Out from Under" is a cover of the song of the same title recorded by Joanna Pacitti for Bratz: Motion Picture Soundtrack (2007).
- Deluxe edition pressings include a bonus DVD containing footage of the making of the album, director's cut music video of "Womanizer", and a photo gallery. iTunes Store deluxe edition includes the DVD content, excluding the photo gallery.
- On Japanese and UK deluxe edition pressings, "Amnesia" appears after the bonus tracks.
- Australian reissue pressings use the same track listing as Japanese and UK editions.

== Personnel ==
Credits are adapted from the liner notes of Circus.

- Rafael Akinyemi – songwriting (track 1)
- All Sets – set design
- Marcella "Ms. Lago" Araica – additional engineering (track 1), engineering (tracks 4, 8), mixing (tracks 4, 8), songwriting (track 8)
- Stacy Barthe – songwriting (track 8)
- Jim Beanz – additional engineering (track 1), songwriting (track 4), vocal production (track 4)
- Matt Beckly – engineering (track 2), vocal editing (track 2)
- Arnthor Birgisson – songwriting (track 3)
- Benny Blanco – drums (tracks 2, 5 and 11), keyboards (tracks 2, 5 and 11), production (tracks 2, 5 and 11), programming (tracks 2, 5 and 11), songwriting (tracks 2, 5 and 11)
- Bloodshy & Avant – bass (tracks 7 and 13), engineering (tracks 7 and 13), guitar (tracks 7 and 13), keyboards (tracks 7 and 13), mixing (track 7), production (tracks 7 and 13), programming (track 7 and 13), songwriting (tracks 7 and 13)
- David Boyd – additional engineering (track 10)
- Luke Boyd – backing vocals (track 8), songwriting (track 4)
- Nikesha Briscoe – production (track 1), songwriting (track 1)
- Jim Carauna – additional engineering (track 13)
- Chad Carlisle – engineering assistance (track 2)
- The Clutch – engineering (track 13), production (track 13), songwriting (track 13)
- Tom Coyne – mastering (all tracks)
- Danja – production (tracks 4 and 8), songwriting (tracks 4 and 8)
- Brendan Dekora – engineering (track 1), engineering assistance (track 12), mixing assistance (track 12)
- Cathy Dennis – backing vocals (track 2)
- Dr. Luke – drums (tracks 2, 5 and 11), guitar (tracks 2, 5 and 11), keyboards (tracks 2, 5 and 11), production (tracks 2, 5 and 11), programming (tracks 2, 5 and 11), songwriting (tracks 2, 5 and 11)
- Pati Dubroff – make-up
- Bojan "Genius" Dugić – engineering (track 1)
- Laura Duncan – styling
- Eric Eylands – engineering assistance (tracks 5, 6, 9 and 11)
- James Fauntleroy II – songwriting (track 10)
- Niklas Flyckt – mixing (track 13)
- Serban Ghenea – mixing (tracks 1, 2, 5, 6 and 11)
- Angela N. Golightly – production coordination (track 10)
- Aniela Gottwald – engineering assistance (tracks 5 and 11)
- Tatiana Gottwald – engineering assistance (track 2)
- John Hanes – additional Pro Tools engineering (tracks 1, 2, 5, 6 and 11)
- Dabling Harward – engineering (track 10)
- Leah Haywood – backing vocals (track 3)
- Wayne Hector – songwriting (track 3)
- Jeri Heiden – art direction
- John Heiden – design
- Andrew Hey – engineering (track 10)
- Sam Holland – engineering (tracks 2, 5 and 11)
- Anders Hvenare – mixing (track 7)
- Steven Jacobi – production management
- Henrik Jonback – bass (track 13), engineering (tracks 7 and 13), guitar (tracks 7 and 13), songwriting (tracks 7 and 13)
- Chris Kasych – engineering assistance (tracks 2, 5)
- Claude Kelly – backing vocals (tracks 2 and 5), songwriting (tracks 2 and 5), vocal production (track 5)
- Kinnda – backing vocals (track 6)
- Rob Knox – production (track 10), songwriting (track 10)
- Savan Kotecha – songwriting (track 6)
- Alexander Kronlund – songwriting (track 6)
- Derik Lee – engineering assistance (track 1)
- Let's Go to War – instrumentation (track 9), production (track 9), programming (track 9), songwriting (track 9)
- Kasia Livingston – backing vocals (track 7), songwriting (track 7)
- Myah Marie – backing vocals (track 2)
- Max Martin – backing vocals (track 6), production (track 6), programming (track 6), songwriting (track 6)
- Tony Maserati – mixing (track 9)
- Harvey Mason, Jr. – mixing (track 10), production (track 10), songwriting (track 10)
- Chris McMillan – hair
- Nicole Morier – backing vocals (track 9), songwriting (track 9), vocal production (track 9)
- Jackie Murphy – art direction
- Candice Nelson – backing vocals (track 13)
- Jared Newcomb – engineering assistance (tracks 4 and 8), mixing assistance (tracks 4 and 8)
- Debi Nova – backing vocals (track 11)
- The Outsyders – production (track 1)
- Andy Page – acoustic guitar (tracks 3 and 12), drum programming (tracks 3 and 12), electric guitar (tracks 3 and 12), engineering (tracks 3 and 12), mixing (tracks 3 and 12), piano (track 12), synth bass (track 3), synthesizer (track 12), strings (track 12)
- Shelly Peiken – songwriting (track 3)
- Tim Roberts – mixing assistance (tracks 1, 2, 5, 6 and 11)
- Larry Rudolph – executive production, management
- Anna Schoenberger – prop design
- Kesha Sebert – backing vocals (track 11)
- Shellback – programming (track 6), songwriting (track 6)
- Guy Sigsworth – drum programming (track 3), hang samples (track 3), keyboards (track 3), production (tracks 3 and 12), songwriting (track 12), strings (track 3)
- Britney Spears – songwriting (tracks 9, 10 and 12), vocals (all tracks)
- Nick Steinhardt – design
- Ron Taylor – Pro Tools editing (tracks 4 and 8)
- Valente Torrez – engineering assistance (track 3), mixing assistance (track 3)
- Kate Turning – photography
- Windy Wagner – backing vocals (track 5)
- Seth Waldmann – engineering (track 6)
- Henry Walter – engineering (track 9)
- Eric Weaver – additional engineering (track 9), engineering assistance (track 2, 5 and 11)
- Teresa LaBarbera Whites – A&R, executive production
- Chris Worthy – guitars (track 9)
- David "Touch" Wright – production coordination (track 10)
- Emily Wright – engineering (tracks 2, 5 and 11), vocal editing (tracks 2, 5 and 11)
- Andrew Wyatt – engineering (track 7)

== Charts ==
=== Weekly charts ===
Weekly chart performance during 2008-2009
Chart (2008–2009)	Peak position
Argentine Albums (CAPIF)	2
Australian Albums (ARIA)	3
Austrian Albums (Ö3 Austria)	9
Belgian Albums (Ultratop Flanders)	7
Belgian Albums (Ultratop Wallonia)	4
Canadian Albums (Billboard)	1
Croatian Albums (HDU)	13
Croatian International Albums (HDU)	4
Czech Albums (ČNS IFPI)	23
Danish Albums (Hitlisten)	4
Dutch Albums (Album Top 100)	10
European Top 100 Albums (Billboard)	1
Finnish Albums (Suomen virallinen lista)	16
French Albums (SNEP)	3
German Albums (Offizielle Top 100)	9
Greek Albums (IFPI)	14
Hungarian Albums (MAHASZ)	22
Irish Albums (IRMA)	2
Italian Albums (FIMI)	9
Japanese Albums (Oricon)	5
Mexican Albums (Top 100 Mexico)	3
Mexican International Albums (Top 100 Mexico)	1
New Zealand Albums (RMNZ)	6
Norwegian Albums (VG-lista)	21
Polish Albums (ZPAV)	32
Portuguese Albums (AFP)	28
Russian Albums (2M)	1
Scottish Albums (Official Charts)	7
Slovenian Albums (IFPI)	12
South African Albums (RISA)	15
Spanish Albums (Promusicae)	10
Swedish Albums (Sverigetopplistan)	19
Swiss Albums (Schweizer Hitparade)	1
Taiwanese Albums (Five Music)	1
Uruguay Albums (CUD)	3
UK Albums (Official Charts)	4
US Billboard 200	1

Weekly chart performance during 2023
Chart (2023)	Peak position
Spanish Albums (PROMUSICAE)	56

=== Year-end charts ===
2008 year-end chart performance
Chart	Position
Australian Albums (ARIA)	25
Australian Dance Albums (ARIA)	5
Belgian Albums (Ultratop Wallonia)	96
Danish Albums (Hitlisten)	33
French Albums (SNEP)	50
Greek International Albums (IFPI)	23
Italian Albums (FIMI)	67
Mexican Albums (Top 100 Mexico)	44
Mexican International Albums (Top 100 Mexico)	11
New Zealand Albums (RMNZ)	36
Russian Albums (2M)	2
Swedish Albums (Sverigetopplistan)	86
UK Albums (OCC)	61
Worldwide Albums (IFPI)	15

2009 year-end chart performance
Chart	Position
Australian Albums (ARIA)	47
Australian Dance Albums (ARIA)	6
Austrian Albums (Ö3 Austria)	66
Belgian Albums (Ultratop Flanders)	63
Belgian Albums (Ultratop Wallonia)	40
Canadian Albums (Billboard)	5
Danish Albums (Hitlisten)	91
European Top 100 Albums (Billboard)	44
French Albums (SNEP)	101
Japanese Albums (Oricon)	99
Mexican Albums (Top 100 Mexico)	51
Mexican International Albums (Top 100 Mexico)	16
Swiss Albums (Schweizer Hitparade)	94
UK Albums (OCC)	139
US Billboard 200	6

== Certifications ==
Certifications and sales
Region	Certification	Certified units/sales
Argentina (CAPIF)	Gold	20,000^{^}
Australia (ARIA)	2× Platinum	140,000^{^}
Belgium (BRMA)	Gold	15,000^{*}
Brazil	—	30,000
Canada (Music Canada)	4× Platinum	320,000^{‡}
Denmark (IFPI Danmark)	2× Platinum	40,000^{‡}
France (SNEP)	Gold	200,000
Germany (BVMI)	Gold	100,000^{^}
Greece (IFPI Greece)	Gold	7,500^{^}
Hungary (MAHASZ)	Gold	3,000^{^}
Ireland (IRMA)	Platinum	15,000^{^}
Italy (FIMI)	Gold	65,000 (Note: In Italy, Circus sold 40,000 units by the end of 2008. In 2026, it was certified gold by Federazione Industria Musicale Italiana (FIMI), for album-equivalent units of 25,000 since 2009, pushing its sales total to 65,000.)
Japan (RIAJ)	Gold	150,000
Mexico (AMPROFON)	Gold	40,000^{^}
New Zealand (RMNZ)	Platinum	15,000^{^}
Poland (ZPAV)	Gold	10,000^{*}
Russia (NFPF)	2× Platinum	40,000^{*}
Switzerland (IFPI Switzerland)	Gold	15,000^{^}
United Kingdom (BPI)	Platinum	300,000^{^}
United States (RIAA)	3× Platinum	3,000,000^{‡}
Summaries
GCC (IFPI Middle East)	Gold	3,000^{*}
Worldwide	—	4,000,000
^{*} Sales figures based on certification alone.^{^} Shipments figures based on certification alone.^{‡} Sales+streaming figures based on certification alone.

== Release history ==
Release dates and formats
Region	Date	Edition(s)	Format(s)	Label(s)	Ref.
Brazil	November 24, 2008	Standard	CD; digital download	Sony	
United States	November 24, 2008	Standard	Streaming (Note: exclusive to imeem)	Jive	
Denmark	November 28, 2008	Standard; deluxe	CD; CD + DVD	Sony	
France	November 28, 2008	Standard; deluxe	CD; CD + DVD; digital download	Jive	
Germany	November 28, 2008	Standard; deluxe	CD; CD + DVD; digital download	Sony	
Australia	November 29, 2008	Standard; deluxe	CD; CD + DVD; digital download	Sony	
Hong Kong	December 1, 2008	Standard; deluxe	CD; CD + DVD	Sony	
Poland	December 1, 2008	Standard; deluxe	CD; CD + DVD	Sony	
United Kingdom	December 1, 2008	Standard; deluxe	CD; CD + DVD; digital download	Jive	
Canada	December 2, 2008	Standard; deluxe	CD; CD + DVD; digital download	Sony	
United States	December 2, 2008	Standard; deluxe	CD; CD + DVD; digital download	Jive	
Japan	December 3, 2008	Standard	CD	BMG Japan	
Japan	March 25, 2009	Deluxe	CD + DVD	BMG Japan	
United States	March 31, 2023	Standard	Vinyl (Note: Prior to the 2023 vinyl release, Circus was made available on vinyl and cassette exclusively at Urban Outfitters, in 2019 and 2021, respectively.)	Legacy	
Australia	April 28, 2023	Standard	Vinyl	Sony	
Europe	April 28, 2023	Standard	Vinyl	Sony	

== See also ==
- Britney Spears discography
- List of Billboard 200 number-one albums of 2008
- List of number-one albums of 2008 (Canada)
- Britney Spears conservatorship case
