= Let's Go to War =

Canadian electronic music trio

- Origin: Toronto, Ontario, Canada
- Genres: Electronic
- Label: Last Gang
- Members: Adrien Gough; Peter-John Kerr; Henry Walter

Let's Go to War is a Canadian electronic music trio formed in Toronto, Ontario, Canada in 2008. The music group is made up of members Henry Walter, Adrien Gough, and Peter-John Kerr. The band is signed to Last Gang Records.

Let's Go to War has remixed songs for Jully Black, Fritz Helder & The Phantoms, Brick & Lace, The Carps, and Hilary Duff. In 2008, Let's Go To War produced and co-wrote the track "Mmm Papi", alongside Nicole Morier and Britney Spears, which appeared on Spears' album Circus.

The band's debut album Karmageddon was released 31 August 2009 on Last Gang.

Let's Go to War has been inactive since 2010.

== Discography ==
=== Singles ===
- 2008 Burn Down the Disco (Last Gang)

=== Albums ===
- 2009 Karmageddon (Last Gang)
