= The Outsyders =

American record production and songwriting team

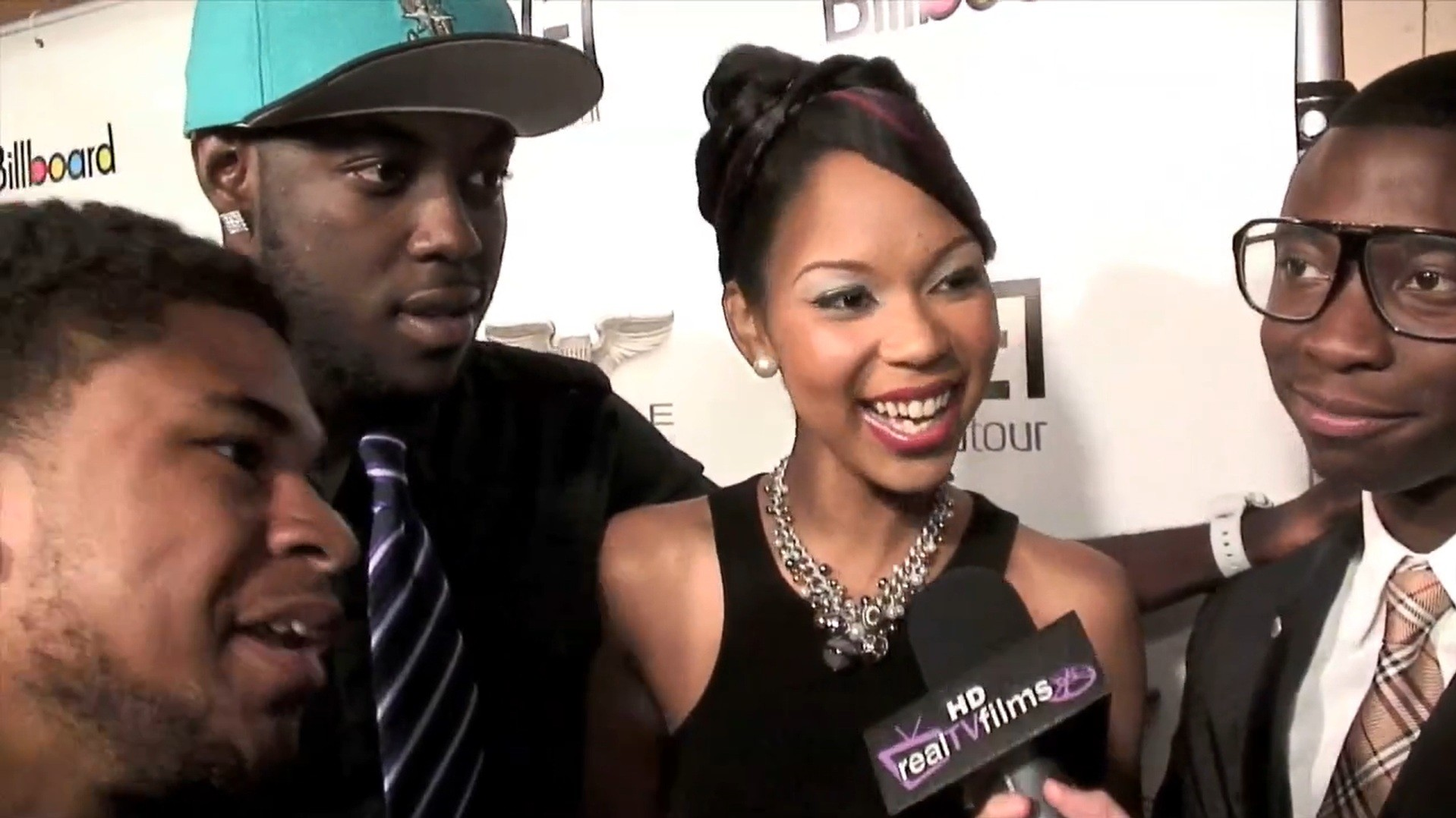
- Left to right: Dean Beresford (Boy Wonder), Rapheal Akinyemi (Ro.A), Nikesha Briscoe (K. Briscoe), Ervin Ward (Wiz Kid) in 2009

Background information
- Origin: Atlanta, Georgia, United States
- Genres: Electropop; synth-pop; dubstep; R&B; hip hop
- Occupations: Producers; Songwriters
- Years active: 2008–2015
- Label: Sony ATV
- Past members: Rafael Akinyemi; Nikesha Briscoe; Kamran Mian; Ervin Ward; Dean Beresford

The Outsyders was a production team from Atlanta, Georgia, which consisted of Dean Beresford (Deaneaux), Nikesha Briscoe (K. Briscoe), Kamran Main (KAM), Ervin Ward (Wiz Kid), and J.L (Jdkid)(Rapheal Akinyemi (Ro.A). Their writing and production talents were first featured on "Womanizer," from Britney Spears' sixth studio album Circus. The single was officially released on September 26, 2008, and peaked at No. 1 on the Billboard Hot 100 on October 15, 2008, setting a new record on the Billboard Hot 100 making a near-maximum 96-1 rise. The team also received a grammy nomination for the 2009 Grammy Awards in the category of Best Dance Recording. The group was featured on "Oh-Oh, Yeah-Yea" from Keyshia Cole's 2008 album A Different Me and more.

== Production Discography ==
=== 2008 ===
==== Britney Spears - Circus ====
- 01. "Womanizer"

==== Keyshia Cole - A Different Me ====
- 07. "Oh-Oh, Yeah-Yea" (featuring Nas)

=== 2009 ===
==== Cobra Starship - Hot Mess ====
- 01. "Nice Guys Finish Last"

==== Jay-Z - The Blueprint 3 ====
- 01. "Reminder"

== Awards and nominations ==
Year	Awards	Category	Recipient	Outcome
2010	Grammys	Best Dance Recording	Britney Spears	Nominated
