= Anders Hvenare =

Swedish mix engineer

Anders Hvenare is a mix engineer who resides in Stockholm, Sweden. He has mixed songs for such artists as Miike Snow, Zowie, Britney Spears, Marit Bergman, Shout Out Louds, Rachele Royale, Niki & the Dove, Elliphant, Loreen, Miriam Bryant, Oskar Linnros, Rebecca & Fiona, Agnes, Fibes Oh Fibes, Alex Saidac, Jonathan Johansson, Tove Styrke, Laleh, I Blame Coko (Bloodshy & Avant Remix), and Maroon 5 (remix album), Isac Elliot.
