= Womanizer (song) =

2008 single by Britney Spears

Single by Britney Spears

from the album Circus
- Released: September 26, 2008
- Studio: Glenwood Place Studios in Burbank; Legacy Studios in New York City
- Genre: Electropop; dance-pop
- Length: 3:44
- Label: Jive; Zomba
- Songwriter: The Outsyders
- Producer: The Outsyders

Britney Spears singles chronology
"Break the Ice" (2008)	"Womanizer" (2008)	"Circus" (2008)

Music video
- "Womanizer" on YouTube

"Womanizer" is a song by American singer Britney Spears from her sixth studio album, Circus (2008). It was released on September 26, 2008, by Jive Records as the lead single of the album. Produced and written by The Outsyders, the song was re-recorded after a snippet was leaked onto the internet. "Womanizer" is an up-tempo electropop and dance-pop song. Described by Spears as a girl anthem, the song's lyrics recall a womanizing man, while the protagonist of the song makes clear she knows who he really is.

"Womanizer" received critical acclaim with critics mostly praising its hook, melody and empowering lyrics. Critics also observed it as a stand-out track from the album, while some deemed it a comeback single for Spears. It became a major global success, topping the charts in twelve countries, including the United States, and reached the top five in every country it charted in, as well as receiving several certifications from multiple countries. In the United States, "Womanizer" was Spears' first single to reach number one since "...Baby One More Time" in 1999. The song broke the record for the highest jump to number one at a time which was later broken by Kelly Clarkson's "My Life Would Suck Without You" in 2009. It is also Spears' best-selling digital song in the country, having sold over 3.5 million copies. The song received a nomination for Best Dance Recording at the 52nd Grammy Awards, becoming her second nomination in the category.

The music video, directed by Joseph Kahn, was created by Spears as a sequel to the music video of "Toxic". It portrays Spears as a woman who disguises herself in different costumes and follows her boyfriend through his daily activities to expose him in the end. The video also contains interspersed scenes of Spears naked in a steam room, as a response to the attacks she had received over the years about her weight. The video was also nominated for two categories at the 2009 MTV Video Music Awards, and won for the Best Pop Video.

The song has been covered by a numerous artists from different genres, including Lily Allen, Franz Ferdinand and Girls Aloud. Spears performed "Womanizer" on several television shows including The X Factor and Good Morning America, as well as award shows such as the 2008 Bambi Awards. She has also performed the song at The Circus Starring Britney Spears (2009), the Femme Fatale Tour (2011) and Britney: Piece of Me (2013).

== Background ==
The song was written and co-produced by Nikesha Briscoe and Rafael Akinyemi of the production team, the Outsyders. Spears recorded main vocals with Brendan Dakora at Glenwood Place Studios in Burbank, California and Bojan "Genius" Dugic at Legacy Studios in New York City. Pro Tools engineering was done by John Hanes, assisted by Tim Roberts. On September 19, 2008, a low quality 37 second snippet of the song was posted on the official website of 107.5 The River, a radio station in Lebanon, Tennessee. According to Jive Records, a representative of the label played a rough mix of the song for people at the station, who recorded it and leaked it on the Internet. The snippet was later removed from the website. The song was scheduled to premiere on September 23, 2008, but the release was delayed when Spears went into the studio to re-record some vocals. The new recordings were done with Jim Beanz and Marcella "Ms. Lago" Araica. The song was finally mixed by Serban Ghenea at MixStar Studios in Virginia.

== Music and lyrics ==
Womanizer
The pre-chorus of "Womanizer", in which the title is repeated eight times.

"Womanizer" is an uptempo electropop and dance-pop song with dark synths that runs through a dance oriented beat. It has been compared to previous Spears' songs such as "Toxic" (2004) and "Ooh Ooh Baby" (2007). It is written in the verse–pre-chorus–chorus form. The track opens with its characteristical sirens.

According to Ann Powers of the Los Angeles Times, Spears' "quick-witted" vocals are similar to the style of the Andrews Sisters. It was also noted by Daily News writer Jim Farber that Spears' delivery has a "tone of petulance". After the bridge, Spears sings the chorus one more time and the song ends while the beat drops and Spears sings the "you're a womanizer, baby" hook.

The song is set in a 12/8 time signature and played in the key of C♯ minor at a tempo of 137 beats per minute. The chord progression in the song is C♯m – F♯m – E – D♯ – D.

Lyrically, the song refers to a womanizing man. It has been suggested that the lyrics address Spears' ex-husband Kevin Federline.

== Critical reception ==
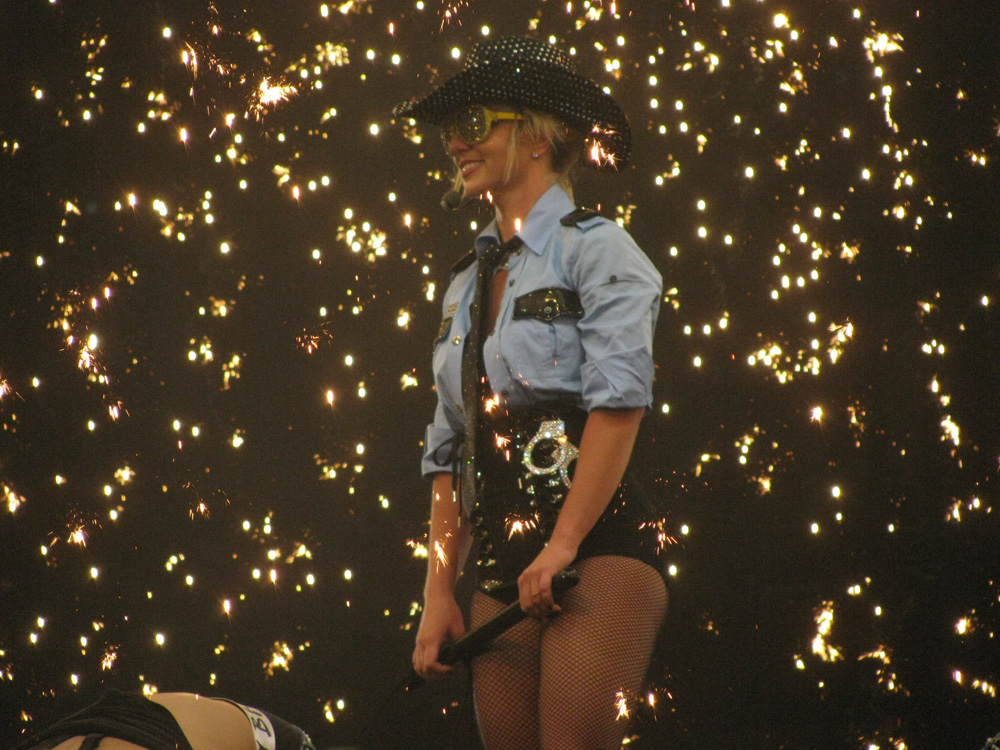
Spears performing "Womanizer" at The Circus Starring Britney Spears

Upon release, "Womanizer" received critical acclaim. Peter Robinson of The Observer gave the song the maximum five stars referring to it as a "comeback single" and as having a "genius hook". He added that the song "[has] been called lazy, largely by misinformed people who also think that Kylie's 'la la la's would have been better with proper words". Popjustice compared it to "Some Girls" by Rachel Stevens and added "[The] track lays a really strong foundation for the fully-realised comeback that didn't quite happen last time and it's hard not to think of it as a late contender for single of the year. [...] It's literally quite good". Myrddin Gwynedd of The New Zealand Herald said "it's got hit written all over it". On the week of November 24, 2008, the Derby Telegraph chose it as single of the week. In the album review, Nekesa Mumbi Moody of The Providence Journal said that along with "Shattered Glass", they were "[two] fun disco tracks".

USA Today writer Steve Jones named it one of the standout tracks of the album and commented that "she seems most at ease when she's playing the teasing tart". Talia Kraines of the BBC commented that Spears needed more songs like "Womanizer", saying "Britney 2.0 needs to be full of wild dancefloor driven moves". Simon Price of The Independent commented the song borrows its electronic sound from Goldfrapp. Ann Powers of the Los Angeles Times complimented Spears' delivery and the lyrics, saying the song is "about the kind of girl power that's focused on besting one obnoxious man, is also vintage and contemporary at the same time – more feminism as individualism". Mike Newmark of PopMatters called the song " a meaty, high-voltage shuffler helmed by the Outsyders, who do an admirable job of recreating the chemistry of Spears and Danja on last year's single 'Gimme More'".

Jim Farber of the Daily News said the pre-chorus was the most repetitive in a pop song since the Shaggs's "Gimmie Dat Ding". Jim Abbott of the Orlando Sentinel called it "basically an adult update of her teen-pop tease act". Ian Watson of Dotmusic wrote that Spears sounded "trapped on this single. Not trapped, as in desperate and distraught, but trapped as in literally frozen – like she's been placed into a robot on a production line and she has to sing these words, dance these steps, work it like this, until the spotlight snaps off and the factory's powered down for the night". The song has been nominated for a Grammy Award in the category of Best Dance Recording on December 2, 2009. Spears had previously won the category in the 2005 ceremony for her single "Toxic". However, it lost to Lady Gaga's "Poker Face".

== Commercial performance ==
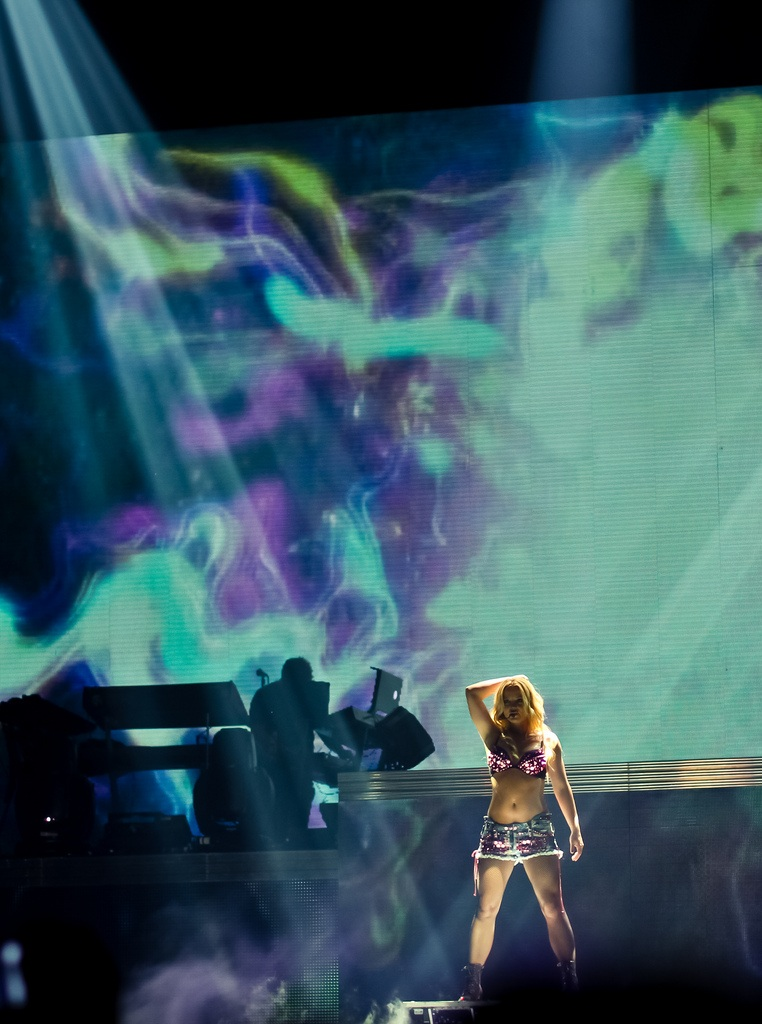
Spears performing "Womanizer" at the Femme Fatale Tour

In the United States, the song entered the Billboard Hot 100 at number ninety-six on the issue dated October 18, 2008. The following week, the song jumped to number one breaking the records for largest jump to number one and largest jump to any position in the history of the chart, previously held by T.I.'s "Live Your Life" (feat. Rihanna) and Beyoncé and Shakira's "Beautiful Liar", respectively. The record was later broken by Kelly Clarkson's "My Life Would Suck Without You". It also garnered first-week download sales of 286,000, the biggest opening-week tally by a female artist since Nielsen SoundScan began tracking digital downloads in 2003, surpassing the record previously held by Mariah Carey's "Touch My Body". The record was broken on January 27, 2010, by Taylor Swift's "Today Was a Fairytale". "Womanizer" was Spears' first number one single since her debut "...Baby One More Time" in 1999. On the week of January 3, 2009, the song reached number one on the Billboard Pop Songs and number six on Radio Songs. As of July 2009, "Womanizer" was listed at number thirty-nine in the best selling digital songs of all time, with sales over 2,777,600. As of March 2015, "Womanizer" has sold 3.5 million digital downloads in the United States, according to Nielsen SoundScan. It is Spears' best-selling digital single in the country.

In Canada, the single topped the Canadian Hot 100 on October 18, 2008, and stayed in the position for five consecutive weeks. "Womanizer" entered the Australian charts on October 13, 2008, at number sixteen. Three weeks later, it peaked at number five. It shipped over 70,000 copies, earning a platinum certification by the Australian Recording Industry Association (ARIA). In New Zealand, the song peaked at number nine on October 27, 2008. The song was certified gold according to the Recording Industry Association of New Zealand (RIANZ), selling over 7,500 copies. The track debuted at number four in the United Kingdom on November 9, 2008, and reached its peak position of number three four weeks later. On January 16, 2009, it was certified silver by the British Phonographic Industry (BPI), with sales over 200,000 copies. According to The Official Charts Company, the song has sold 447,000 copies there. "Womanizer" reached the peak in a number of European countries, including Belgium (Flanders), Croatia, Denmark, Finland, France, Norway and Sweden. It also reached the top ten in Austria, Belgium (Wallonia), Czech Republic, Germany, Italy, Spain and the Netherlands. In addition, the track became Spears' sixth European number-one single. As of May 2020, "Womanizer" has generated over 202 million streams in the US.

== Music video ==
=== Development ===
"Working on 'Womanizer' with Joseph was a lot of fun. [...] He makes sure that he gets the types of shots that go with the music. It's not like a movie, it's more like a musical. You know, if I say 'on the hi-hat here or on the drumbeat here, I want my leg to be in the air.' And it's that detail, and it does make a difference, and that's what he can do. It's very rare to find people that still know how to do that."

— Spears about working with Joseph Kahn.

The music video was filmed on September 24 and 25, 2008 in Los Angeles, directed by Joseph Kahn, who previously worked with Spears for the music videos of "Stronger" and "Toxic".

According to Kahn, Spears pitched him her original concept, which included all the main elements used in the final version. Spears thought of the video as a sequel to "Toxic", as seen in her documentary Britney: For the Record, whereas Kahn approached it as "a 2008 answer" to the previous clip. He added that, "'Toxic' was a crystallization of her career at that time, [...] There are elements and moments of that I felt could [have been] improved. ['Womanizer'] is a bit more fashion-forward". About how the concept of the video related to their previous work, Kahn commented that "It's just a great girl fantasy. There are things she's really good at, like having a really natural knack for knowing what girls want. [...] It's a much more mature sound and much more mature lyrics, and she always has the greatest ideas. She's hyper-aware of pop culture".

The costumes and looks for each of the different women were chosen by Spears and Kahn. The scenes in the sauna were suggested by Kahn, as a response to the attacks Spears received over the years about her weight. He stated, "I knew that the whole world would be watching, so I wanted something in there that stated, 'This is Britney, this is why you should respect her'". The set was cleared for two hours, leaving her and Kahn alone shooting the sequence. Kahn also decided to end the video with an image of Spears smiling, because "We just needed to tell everybody she's OK".

A censored version of the music video premiered on October 10, 2008, on ABC's 20/20 at the end of their show. The uncensored version premiered on MTV the same night.

=== Synopsis ===
Spears in the sauna scene in the music video

The video begins with an opening caption that reads "Womanizer". During the introduction, Spears is naked and smiling in a sauna, while covering herself with her hands. These scenes are seen throughout the video. When the first verse begins, the official version of Spears wearing a slip nightgown is making breakfast for her boyfriend (Brandon Stoughton) as he gets ready for work. When he is at the office, he sees a new secretary, which is actually Spears in disguise wearing horn-rimmed glasses and a pencil skirt. She starts dancing in front of him and sings the chorus. She makes him follow her into the photocopier, where she photocopies her buttocks. On the back, a man who appears in the plane scene on "Toxic" can be seen. Then, Spears is disguised as a red-haired, tattooed waitress in a restaurant. She dances around him with her dancers and plays with him over the kitchen counter. After this, her boyfriend is seen getting driven home by Spears, disguised as a chauffeur. She starts to kiss him, driving the car with her heel until both get home. Once they get into the bedroom, Spears reveals that she was the three women he was "womanizing" all along. She then begins attacking her boyfriend. This is shown through Spears as her three alter egos, and then as the real version of herself. Spears throws a blanket over her boyfriend and makes the bed. The video ends with Spears smiling, and a repeat of the opening caption.

=== Reception ===
Margeaux Watson of Entertainment Weekly said the video "looks promising. [...] The dancing is stiff and minimal, a disappointment since her moves are her strong suit. But this is a welcome return to the Britney we love – gorgeous, gyrating, greased up, and gamely playing the vamp". OK! commented that "in addition to seeing Brit in three different sexy getups, the video [...] features an oiled-up Britney writhing around in nothing but a smile". Rolling Stone said the video was "a cross between 'Toxic' and The Office" and added, "she's dancing [and] looking like the old Britney". Courtney Hazlett of MSNBC claimed "When Spears isn't shown naked and writhing in a steam room, she's fired up". TV Guide writer Adam Bryant said that "the music video features some of the most strategically placed hands in music-video history [...] [The] video is quite a return to form for the troubled pop star". The music video for "Womanizer" became a worldwide success right after it premiered on the Internet, gaining seven million viewers in less than 48 hours. The music video was listed as the best video of 2008 in polls by MTV and Fuse TV. It won Music Video of the Year at the 2009 NRJ Music Awards. The video was also nominated for Best Pop Video and Video of the Year at the 2009 MTV Video Music Awards, winning the former category. "Womanizer" was Vevo certified after it reached 100 million views on YouTube.

== Live performances ==
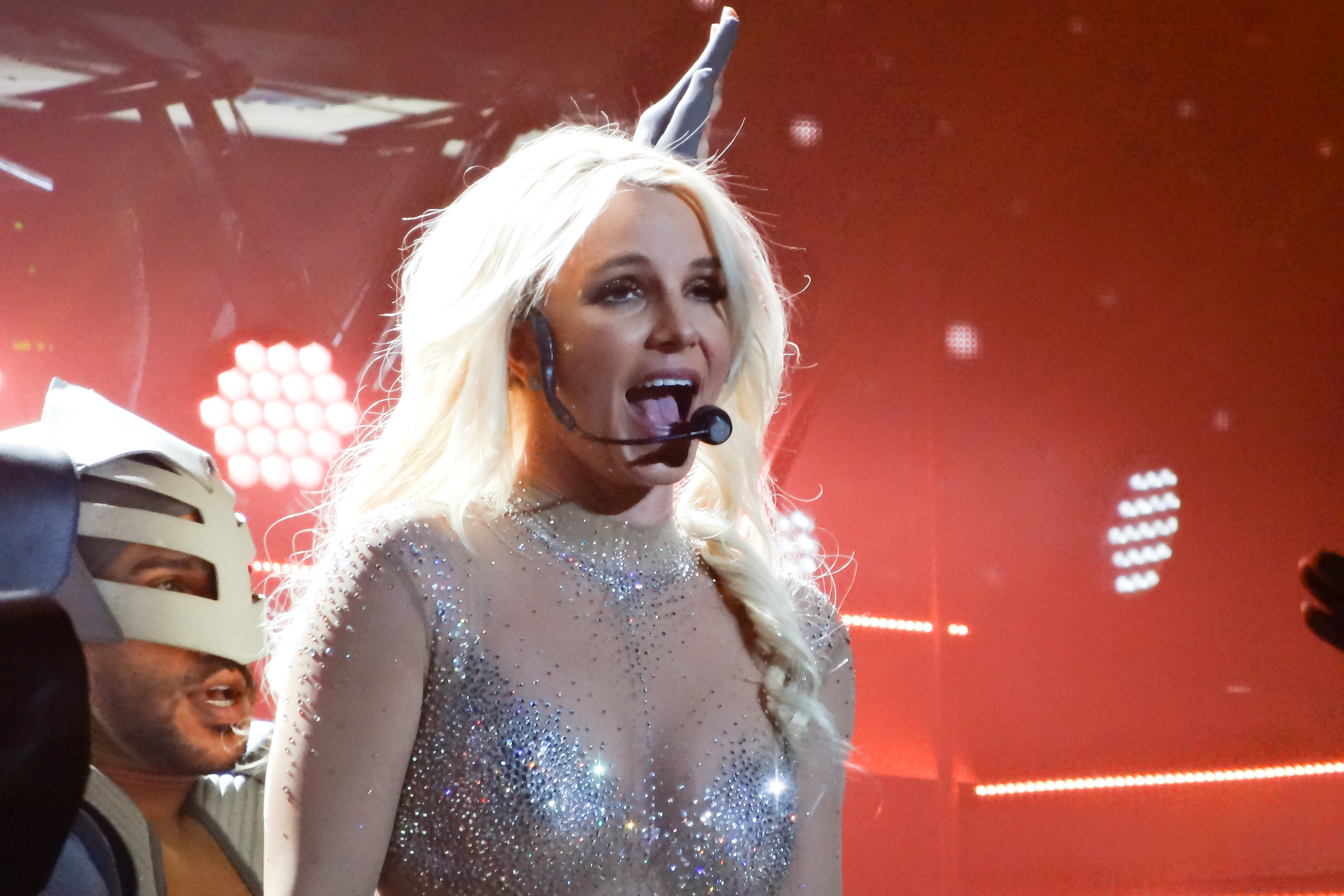
Spears during the performance of "Womanizer" on the Britney: Piece of Me residency concert

The song was performed for the first time at the Bambi Awards in Germany, on November 27, 2008. For the performance, Spears wore hot pants, fishnet stockings and a black top hat. The ensemble was compared to the costume Madonna wore during the first act of her Sticky & Sweet Tour (2008–2009). Spears was also presented with an award for Best International Popstar by Karl Lagerfeld, who said, "I admire you ... not just for your art, but for your energy. [You are] coming back not only as a phoenix but as a bird of paradise". The following night, Spears performed the song at Star Academy, with similar choreography and dance moves but wearing a red strapless dress. On November 30, 2008, Spears performed at The X Factor. On December 2, 2008, she performed the song at Good Morning America along with a performance of "Circus". On December 15, 2008, she performed at the Japanese music show Hey! Hey! Hey! Music Champ.

The song was a major part in The Circus Starring Britney Spears (2009), as the encore of the show. After a video interlude of Spears's music videos set to "Break the Ice" ended, Spears appeared wearing a police officer uniform designed by Dean and Dan Caten, with black sunglasses, a hat with her trademark logo and sequined handcuffs. Her female dancers were also dressed as policewomen, while her male dancers were dressed as criminals. During the performance, she danced and flirted with the male dancers. At the end of the song, she returned to the main stage while her dancers surrounded her and a shower of sparks fell over them. She thanked the audience and bowed to each side of the arena. She left the stage with an instrumental version of "Circus" playing in the background. Jane Stevenson of the Toronto Sun praised the performance for being a standout number in the show.

"Womanizer" was also performed at the Femme Fatale Tour (2011) as the last song of the fourth act. Following "I Wanna Go", which featured her dancing with members of the audience onstage, Spears performed "Womanizer" while surrounded by her dancers dressed as police officers. Shirley Halperin of The Hollywood Reporter stated that "[the] mid-tempo numbers [...] seemed to stall out quickly, where faster offerings like 'Womanizer,' 'I Wanna Go' and 'Toxic' had the sold out crowd jumping in place and pumping their number twos in the air." Ed Masley of The Arizona Republic called the back-to-back performances of "I Wanna Go" and "Womanizer" "a triumphant double shot of dance-pop greatness." Keith Caufireld of Billboard said the performance "seemed a bit flat after the crowd-wowing 'I Wanna Go.'" Spears is currently performing "Womanizer" as the second song for her Las Vegas residency, Britney: Piece of Me at The AXIS theater. She is accompanied by dancers clad in spandex outfits and masks, and walks on their backs.

The song was later performed in a greatest hits medley, at the 2016 Billboard Music Awards. The song was also included in Spears's setlist for the iHeartRadio Music Festival on September 24, 2016. Spears included the song on the set list for the Britney: Live in Concert (2017) and Piece of Me Tour (2018).

== Cover versions and media appearance ==
"Womanizer" has been covered by many artists from a variety of music genres, as well as a great number of amateurs. Clark Collis of Entertainment Weekly explained that "the song has been covered by other artists with an enthusiasm only matched in recent times by musicians' desire to remake Radiohead's 'Creep' in their own image". On December 8, 2008, New Zealand singer Ladyhawke performed a cover at BBC Radio 1's Live Lounge. The song was covered by American band the All-American Rejects on the Yahoo! Music Pepsi Smash show in December 2008. It was performed in an acoustic version, in which the band members played percussions with beer bottles. The cover also included an excerpt from the Turtles's "Happy Together". British singer Lily Allen also covered the song, because "simple really, I love Britney and I love the song". Her cover was a stripped-down version, that according to Nick Levine of Digital Spy, "might provoke those who reckon it doesn't have much of a chorus to revise their opinion". Allen also performed the song as the encore during her 2009 tour. French singer Sliimy cover was deemed as an "indie makeover". He would later be the opening act of the second Paris date at The Circus Starring Britney Spears.

On January 13, 2009, English singer Ana Silvera covered the song during one of her London concerts. On April 6, 2009, Scottish band Franz Ferdinand also covered the song at Radio 1's Live Lounge. Lead singer Alex Kapranos claimed "It's been the best song out in the last few months". It was also covered regularly by them during their 2009 American spring tour. The song was performed live by British girl group Girls Aloud during their Out of Control Tour, starting April 24, 2009, and released on their 2009 live album Out of Control: Live from the O2. "Womanizer" was also covered by Fall Out Boy, among others. "Weird Al" Yankovic also covered this song for part of the polka medley off his 2011 album Alpocalypse. In the 2012 Glee episode "Britney 2.0", actors Melissa Benoist, Alex Newell and Jenna Ushkowitz performed a cover of the song.

== Track listings ==
- CD single
1. "Womanizer" (Main Version) – 3:43
2. "Womanizer" (Instrumental) – 3:42
- CD maxi single
1. "Womanizer" – 3:43
2. "Womanizer" (Kaskade Remix) – 5:31
3. "Womanizer" (Junior's Tribal Electro Remix) – 8:47
4. "Womanizer" (Instrumental) – 3:42
5. "Womanizer" (Video Enhancement) – 3:49
- Digital download
1. "Womanizer" – 3:43
- Digital download – EP
1. "Womanizer" – 3:43
2. "Womanizer" (Kaskade Remix) – 5:32
3. "Womanizer" (Junior's Tribal Electro Remix) – 8:47
4. "Womanizer" (Instrumental) – 3:42
- Digital download – Remix EP
1. "Womanizer" (Kaskade Remix) – 5:31
2. "Womanizer" (Benny Benassi Extended Mix) – 6:16
3. "Womanizer" (Junior's Tribal Electro Remix) – 8:47
4. "Womanizer" (Jason Nevins Club Mix) – 7:31
5. "Womanizer" (Tonal Extended Mix) – 5:29
- Digital download – Digital 45
1. "Womanizer" – 3:43
2. "Womanizer" (Kaskade Remix) – 5:31

== Credits and personnel ==
=== Management ===
- Recorded at Glenwood Place Studio in Burbank, Legacy Studios in New York City
- Mixed At MixStar Studios
- Mastered At Sterling Sound

=== Personnel ===
- Backing vocals, lead vocals: Britney Spears
- Writers: Nikesha Briscoe, Rafael Akinyemi
- Producers: K. Briscoe and the Outsyders
- Mixing: Serban Ghenea
- Pro Tools editing: John Hanes
- Mastering: Tom Coyne

== Charts ==
=== Weekly charts ===
Chart (2008–2010)	Peak position
Australia (ARIA)	5
Austria (Ö3 Austria Top 40)	4
Belgium (Ultratop 50 Flanders)	1
Belgium (Ultratop 50 Wallonia)	2
Bulgaria (BAMP)	2
Canada Hot 100 (Billboard)	1
Canada CHR/Top 40 (Billboard)	2
Canada Hot AC (Billboard)	3
Chile (EFE)	2
CIS Airplay (TopHit)	4
Czech Republic Airplay (ČNS IFPI)	6
Croatia International Airplay (HRT)	1
Colombia (EFE)	9
Costa Rica (EFE)	2
Denmark (Tracklisten)	1
El Salvador (EFE)	2
Europe (European Hot 100 Singles)	1
European Radio Top 50 (Billboard)	3
Finland (Suomen virallinen lista)	1
France (SNEP)	1
Germany (GfK)	4
Global Dance Tracks (Billboard)	2
Greece Digital Songs (Billboard)	10
Guatemala (EFE)	7
Hungary (Rádiós Top 40)	2
Ireland (IRMA)	2
Israel (Media Forest)	1
Italy (FIMI)	7
Japan Hot 100 (Billboard)	7
Mexico Anglo (Monitor Latino)	3
Netherlands (Dutch Top 40)	21
Netherlands (Single Top 100)	8
New Zealand (Recorded Music NZ)	9
Norway (VG-lista)	1
Portugal Digital Songs (Billboard)	3
Russia Airplay (TopHit)	9
Scottish Singles Sales (Official Charts)	5
South Korea Foreign (Circle)	76
Spain (Promusicae)	8
Sweden (Sverigetopplistan)	1
Switzerland (Schweizer Hitparade)	2
Turkey (Türkiye Top 20)	1
Ukraine Airplay (TopHit)	9
UK Singles (Official Charts)	3
US Billboard Hot 100	1
US Adult Pop Airplay (Billboard)	32
US Dance Club Songs (Billboard)	9
US Dance Singles Sales (Billboard)	1
US Pop Airplay (Billboard)	1
US Pop 100 (Billboard)	2
US Rhythmic Airplay (Billboard)	21

=== Monthly charts ===
Monthly chart performance
Chart (2008)	Peak position
CIS (TopHit)	7

=== Year-end charts ===
Chart (2008)	Position
Australia (ARIA)	40
Belgium (Ultratop 50 Flanders)	44
Belgium (Ultratop 50 Wallonia)	63
Canada (Canadian Hot 100)	65
CIS (TopHit)	117
France (SNEP)	28
France Download (SNEP)	11
Hungary (Rádiós Top 40)	87
Italy (FIMI)	42
Lebanon (The Official Lebanese Top 20)	22
Netherlands (Download Top 100)	99
Norway (VG-lista)	21
Russia Airplay (TopHit)	151
Sweden (Sverigetopplistan)	35
Switzerland (Schweizer Hitparade)	56
UK Singles (OCC)	33
US Billboard Hot 100	80

Chart (2009)	Position
Austria (Ö3 Austria Top 40)	45
Belgium (Ultratop 50 Flanders)	33
Belgium (Ultratop 50 Wallonia)	21
Brazil (Crowley Broadcast Analysis)	43
Canada (Canadian Hot 100)	36
European Hot 100 Singles (Billboard)	7
France (SNEP)	22
France Download (SNEP)	41
Germany (Media Control GfK)	100
Hungary (Rádiós Top 40)	14
Japan Adult Contemporary (Billboard)	68
Poland (ZPAV)	1
Sweden (Sverigetopplistan)	93
Switzerland (Schweizer Hitparade)	57
Taiwan (Yearly Singles Top 100)	41
UK Singles (OCC)	118
US Billboard Hot 100	39
US Mainstream Top 40 (Billboard)	26

== Certifications and sales ==
Certifications and sales
Region	Certification	Certified units/sales
Australia (ARIA)	Platinum	70,000^{^}
Belgium (BRMA)	Gold	10,000^{*}
Denmark (IFPI Danmark)	Platinum	15,000^{^}
Finland (Musiikkituottajat)	Gold	5,813
France	—	209,692
Germany (BVMI)	Gold	150,000^{‡}
Italy	—	14,875
Italy (FIMI) (since 2009)	Gold	35,000^{‡}
New Zealand (RMNZ)	2× Platinum	60,000^{‡}
Spain (Promusicae)	Gold	10,000^{*}
Spain (Promusicae) (since 2015)	Gold	30,000^{‡}
Sweden (GLF)	Gold	10,000^{^}
United Kingdom (BPI)	2× Platinum	1,200,000^{‡}
United States (RIAA)	6× Platinum	6,000,000^{‡}
^{*} Sales figures based on certification alone.^{^} Shipments figures based on certification alone.^{‡} Sales+streaming figures based on certification alone.

== Release history ==
Release dates and formats
Region	Date	Format(s)	Label(s)	Ref.
Various	September 26, 2008	Streaming	Jive	
Belgium	October 3, 2008	Digital download	Sony Music	
Italy	October 3, 2008	Digital download	Sony Music	
Norway	October 6, 2008	Digital download	Sony Music	
Canada	October 7, 2008	Digital download	Sony Music	
New Zealand	October 7, 2008	Digital download	Sony Music	
Spain	October 7, 2008	Digital download	Sony Music	
United States	October 7, 2008	Contemporary hit radio; rhythmic contemporary	Jive	
Germany	November 14, 2008	CD; maxi	Sony Music	
United Kingdom	November 24, 2008	CD	RCA	
Germany	December 19, 2008	Digital download (EP)	Sony Music	
United States	December 23, 2008	Digital download (EP)	Jive	
