= Larry Rudolph =

American talent manager and former entertainment lawyer

- Born: July 24, 1963 (age 63); The Bronx, New York
- Occupations: Talent manager; Entertainment lawyer
- Spouse(s): Ronna Ilene Gross (divorced); Jennifer Barnet
- Children: 4

Larry Rudolph (born July 24, 1963) is an American talent manager and former entertainment lawyer. He is best known as the former manager of Britney Spears from 1998 until 2021.

== Career ==
Rudolph was born in The Bronx, New York. He graduated from Hofstra University Law School (now Maurice A. Deane School of Law) in 1988 and worked as an entertainment lawyer. In 1992, he formed a New York law firm, Rudolph & Beer. It closed in 2003, with Rudolph stating, "Although I take great pride in my 15-year career as an attorney, I have found that my true passion lies in artist management."

Rudolph has also represented music artists besides Britney Spears such as Avril Lavigne, Miley Cyrus, will.i.am, Courtney Hadwin, Nicole Scherzinger, Justin Timberlake, 98 Degrees, Nick Lachey, DJ Pauly D, Backstreet Boys, O-Town, Toni Braxton, Swizz Beats, Kim Petras and DMX. He is the founder of Reign Deer Entertainment, a management firm, through which he has produced the movie Crossroads (2002) and the reality series Newlyweds: Nick and Jessica (2003–05). In 2007, he co-founded the marketing firm Total Entertainment and Arts Marketing, with Nicole Winnaman. Rudolph launched girl group G.R.L. along with the Pussycat Dolls founder Robin Antin and producers Dr. Luke and Max Martin.

== Personal life ==
Rudolph has been married twice. In 1992, he married his first wife, Ronna Ilene Gross; they had three children: twins Gavin Walker and Trevor Wade, and daughter, Dylan Page, before divorcing. He married his second wife Jennifer Barnet on July 22, 2017, in Sag Harbor, New York. Barnet was previously the makeup stylist for Britney Spears.
