= Circus (Britney Spears song) =

2008 single by Britney Spears

Single by Britney Spears

from the album Circus
- Released: December 2, 2008
- Recorded: 2008
- Studio: Conway (Los Angeles, CA); Glenwood Place (Burbank, CA); Chalice (Los Angeles, CA)
- Genre: Electropop; dance-pop
- Length: 3:12
- Label: Jive
- Songwriters: Łukasz Gottwald; Claude Kelly; Benjamin Levin
- Producers: Dr. Luke; Benny Blanco

Britney Spears singles chronology
"Womanizer" (2008)	"Circus" (2008)	"If U Seek Amy" (2009)

Music video
- "Circus" on YouTube

"Circus" is a song by American singer Britney Spears. It was released on December 2, 2008, through Jive Records as the second single from her sixth studio album of the same name. Claude Kelly wrote the track with its producers Dr. Luke and Benny Blanco. Lyrically, the song is a metaphor for the public's perception of Spears' life, and talks about being an entertainer as well as putting on shows. After listening to the track for the first time, she felt inspired to create an album and a tour with a circus theme. "Circus" is an uptempo electropop and dance-pop song with elements of pop rock and "half-rapped" vocals.

"Circus" was well-received by music critics, with reviewers complimenting Spears' confident persona and praising the song's electronic production. It was a commercial success, charting at number one in Turkey while peaking within the top-five in Bulgaria, Canada, Hungary, Israel, New Zealand, and the United States as well as the top-ten in Australia, Chile, Denmark, Scotland, and Sweden. The track also is her second best-selling digital song in the United States, having sold over 3.2 million downloads as of July 2016. On a global scale, "Circus" was one of the top ten best-selling songs of 2009 with 5.5 million digital copies sold that year across the world, according to the International Federation of the Phonographic Industry (IFPI).

The music video, directed by Francis Lawrence, was released on December 4, 2008. It portrays Spears as the ringmaster of a circus accompanied by different performers, and it is interspersed with scenes of Spears in different circus settings. The video received positive reviews from critics, but was criticized by People for the Ethical Treatment of Animals (PETA) for featuring "cruelly trained animals". However, the exhibitors denied these claims. Spears performed the song on Good Morning America on December 2, 2008. It was also the opening number of the Circus Starring Britney Spears (2009), where she was dressed in a ringmistress outfit, designed to represent a metamorphosis. Spears has also performed the song during her residency concert Britney: Piece of Me.

== Background ==
"Circus" was written by Dr. Luke, Benny Blanco and Claude Kelly, while produced by Luke and Blanco. Luke and Kelly were initially commissioned to work on a new track for Spears, and entered the studio with no concept prepared, as Kelly explained, "just knowing her style and knowing what she does." After Luke came up with the music, they based the song on the public's perception of her life at the time. Spears explained that after listening to "Circus" for the first time, she felt inspired and imagined a story behind it. She also stated, "['Circus'] put the whole album together as far as what I wanted my show to be like. You can play with a circus in so many different ways". "Circus" was recorded at Conway Recording Studios and Chalice Recording Studios in Los Angeles, California, and at Glenwood Place Studio in Burbank, California. Background vocals were provided by Cathy Dennis, Kelly and Myah Marie. Main instrumentation was done by Luke and Blanco. The song was mixed by Serban Ghenea at MixStar Studios in Virginia. "Circus" was announced on October 31, 2008, as the second single from the album, and was officially serviced to U.S. radio stations on December 2, 2008.

== Music and lyrics ==
"Circus"
A sample of "Circus" features Spears singing over a heavy electronic groove.

"Circus" is an uptempo electropop and dance-pop song, with a stomp box beat and elements of pop rock. The song opens with the sound of a drum and builds until Spears starts singing, "There's only two types of people in the world/The ones that entertain and the ones that observe". Spears delivers confident and "half-rapped" vocals, with the verses having usage of synthesizers. Lyrically, the song talks about being an entertainer and putting on shows. She explains her emotions while performing in lines such as: "I feel the adrenaline moving through my veins / Spotlight on me and I'm ready to break". The chorus begins with an electronic sound, while she compares herself, as well as performing to being on the center of a circus ring. According to the sheet music published at Musicnotes.com by Alfred Publishing, "Circus" is composed in the key of F♯ minor with 120 beats per minute, however on the album the song is 115 beats per minute. Spears's vocal range spans from G♯_{2} to C♯_{5}. Kelly commented that "Circus" was "a cool way to get people dancing and having fun", but also have a slight message.

== Critical reception ==
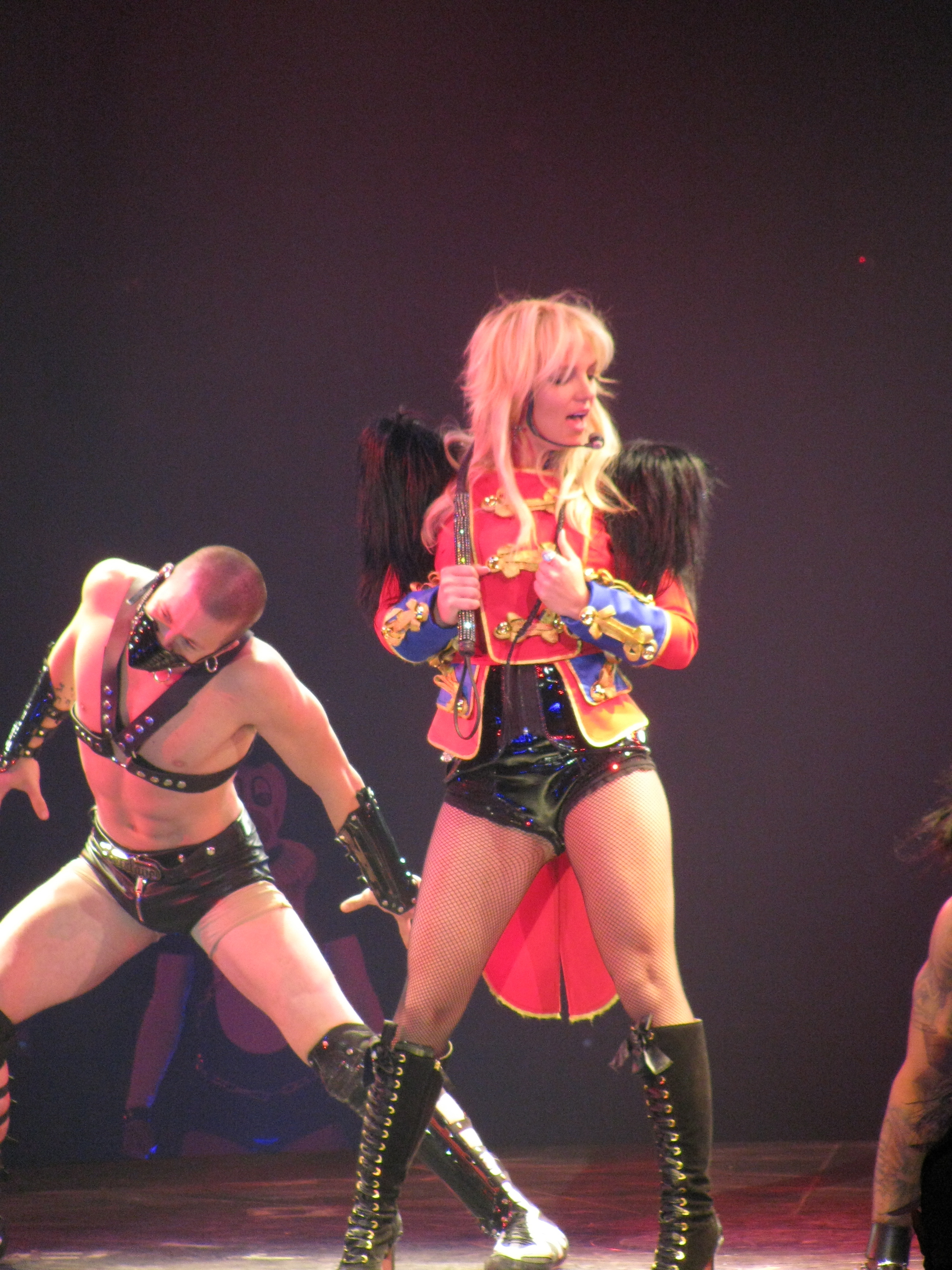
Spears performing "Circus" on the Circus Tour

Nick Levine of Digital Spy described it as "a rampaging monster of a song whose chorus kicks off with a Max Martin-style and Timbaland thump". Popjustice praised the production of the song, compared it to "Break the Ice" and added, "there's a lot of stopping and starting, including a built-in MTV-style dance breakdown segment." Chris Williams of Billboard in its single review appreciated the song for surrounding Spears with "an electronic cyberpop landscape". In the album review, Ann Donahue of Billboard criticized the lyrics for rehashing the theme of fame and compared it to "Lucky" (2000) and "Piece of Me" (2007). Dave De Sylvia of Sputnikmusic said that while "Womanizer" sounded like a Blackout track, "Circus" is more reflective of the album's general mood. Dan Cairns of The Sunday Times named it one of the standout tracks of the album, along with "If U Seek Amy" and "Mannequin". Entertainment Weekly writer Chris Willman noted that, despite the album being titled Circus, the title track is "not about the madhouse her life has become but just a brag about her prowess as a whip-cracking sexual ringmaster."

BBC Music's Talia Kraines thought that the singer "loves the attention being shone directly on her as the 'ringleader' as she sings of adrenaline flowing through her veins when it's time to put on a show." Ben Norman of About.com considered the song a "true and triumphant Britney Spears pop song with a pensive underbelly (the first verse in particular) and a supremely executed hook." Jonny Mugwump of The Quietus said, "a paean to her performance adrenalin, ["Circus" is] a medium-paced, big power-popper topped with an orbit-esque guitar," and commented that the song's lyrics highlight Spears' uniqueness – "the fuck you attitude. Despite everything, regardless of the personal destruction and undoubted hell she might still be haunted by, within the fictional space of the music, this woman couldn't give a damn. She rightly taunts the world around her, sounding utterly defiant. There is no place for apology or humble platitudes." John Murphy of musicOMH also praised its lyrics, describing them as "a confident, and encouraging, return to form." "Circus" was nominated at the 2009 Teen Choice Awards in the category of Choice Music: Single, but lost to Miley Cyrus's "The Climb".

== Commercial performance ==
On December 20, 2008, "Circus" debuted at number three on the US Billboard Hot 100 due to digital sales of over 212,000 units. On the week of March 7, 2009, the song reached number one on the Pop Songs chart and number three on the Hot Dance Club Songs chart. As of July 2016, "Circus" has sold 3.2 million digital downloads in the United States according to Nielsen Soundscan. It is her second best-selling digital single in the country.

In Canada, the track debuted at number two based solely on digital downloads, being blocked from ascending to the top spot by Lady Gaga's "Poker Face". On December 8, 2008, "Circus" entered the Australian Singles Chart at number 15, becoming the "Highest Debut" of the week. On December 22, 2008, the song peaked at number six. It was certified platinum by the Australian Recording Industry Association (ARIA) for sales over 70,000 units. In New Zealand, "Circus" peaked at number four, and was certified gold by the Recording Industry Association of New Zealand (RIANZ) for selling over 7,500 copies. The song was also successful in Europe, peaking at number 12 on the European Hot 100 Singles on March 21, 2009. "Circus" also reached the top 10 in Sweden and the top 20 in Austria, Czech Republic, Finland, Norway, the Netherlands and the United Kingdom. According to the Official Charts Company, the song has sold 227,400 copies in the United Kingdom and is her 13th best-selling single in the country. It became the 10th best-selling digital single of 2009, selling 5.5 million copies worldwide. As of May 2020, "Circus" has generated over 212 million streams in the US.

== Music video ==
=== Development ===
The music video for "Circus" was filmed from October 28 to November 2, 2008, in Los Angeles, California. It was directed by Francis Lawrence, who previously worked with Spears on the music video for her 2001 single "I'm a Slave 4 U". Spears chose Lawrence, since he was the "only person who could capture it, make it really twisted, eccentric and different". On November 17, 2008, an exclusive three-second clip premiered during a promo for her documentary Britney: For the Record. The video was set to be released on December 5, 2008, on Entertainment Tonight, but it was moved at the last minute to December 4, 2008.

=== Synopsis ===
The music video opens with a frame of her hands picking up Curious, and also features a minimal but luxurious necklace and earrings by Bulgari. Spears takes time to admire the jewelry before proceeding with her performance. Lawrence, the director, uses spotlights in various angles to feature the artistry of Spears' dancing skills. The costume designer chose a ringmaster jacket and a top hat along with a baton to channel the circus theme. In order of appearance, animals recorded in the video are doves flying out of a top hat, lions flanking Spears, and elephants doing their own dance steps. As with his previous work with Spears, Lawrence employs a large cast of dancers who nail their routines.

Circus performers include ribbon dancers, contortionists, clowns and a mime on stilts. One group dance scene takes place in the middle of a circus ring with Spears in a ringmaster jacket, sequined hot pants and a feathered top hat. In the second verse, she dances with a chair and a whip wearing a black bra covered in leaves. Intercut scenes, such as Spears in slow motion in front of a shower of sparks, keep the pacing exciting. During the bridge, Spears and her dancers perform a routine backlit by a circle of flames. In the last chorus, Spears returns to the circus ring, surrounded by two elephants, many more circus performers, dancers and fire breathers. The video ends with Spears' signature laugh while putting on a top hat.

=== Reception ===
Davil Balls of Digital Spy described the music video as being "cheeky, seductive and more than a little bit ridiculous" and said that Spears "delivers some killer dance routines". Tim Stack of Entertainment Weekly compared the dance in the chair with the music video of "Stronger" and added that "best of all, she actually looks animated in this video and appears to be having fun". James Montgomery of MTV said that after watching the video "you are overcome with the sudden urge to go to the Big Apple Circus. Or pick up some Curious perfume. Or you know, possibly both". The music video won the category of Best Moves at the MTV Australia Awards 2009. It was also nominated for four VMAs at the 2009 awards in the categories of Best Art Direction, Best Choreography, Best Cinematography and Best Editing. It was also nominated for Best Video in the MTV Europe Music Awards 2009, but lost to Beyoncé's "Single Ladies". The video won Best Video of 2009 in Fuse TV, making Spears the only artist to win two years in a row.

On December 9, 2008, animal rights organization People for the Ethical Treatment of Animals (PETA) issued a press release condemning Spears for using "cruelly trained lions and elephants" and demanding her to "stop using exotic animals in her videos and concerts once and for all". Spears had previously received criticism from the organization when she used an albino python and a caged tiger during a performance of "I'm a Slave 4 U" at the 2001 MTV Video Music Awards. Kari Johnson from Have Trunk Will Travel responded, saying, "[the company] has never issued a written endorsement, nor does it condone using electrical devices to discipline and control elephants except in situations where elephant or human safety is at risk. [...] The American Humane Association monitors animal action in film and television. A representative was on the set of the Britney Spears 'Circus' video with our elephants, Tai and Kitty, to ensure their safety and welfare [...] Britney, the director, producers and the entire crew were respectful of the elephants' needs and comfort and a pleasure to work with." The music video for "Circus" was certified on the digital platform Vevo after reaching 100 million views on YouTube. In 2021, "Circus" went viral on TikTok, and as of May 8, 2021, has been used 426,200 times.

== Live performances ==
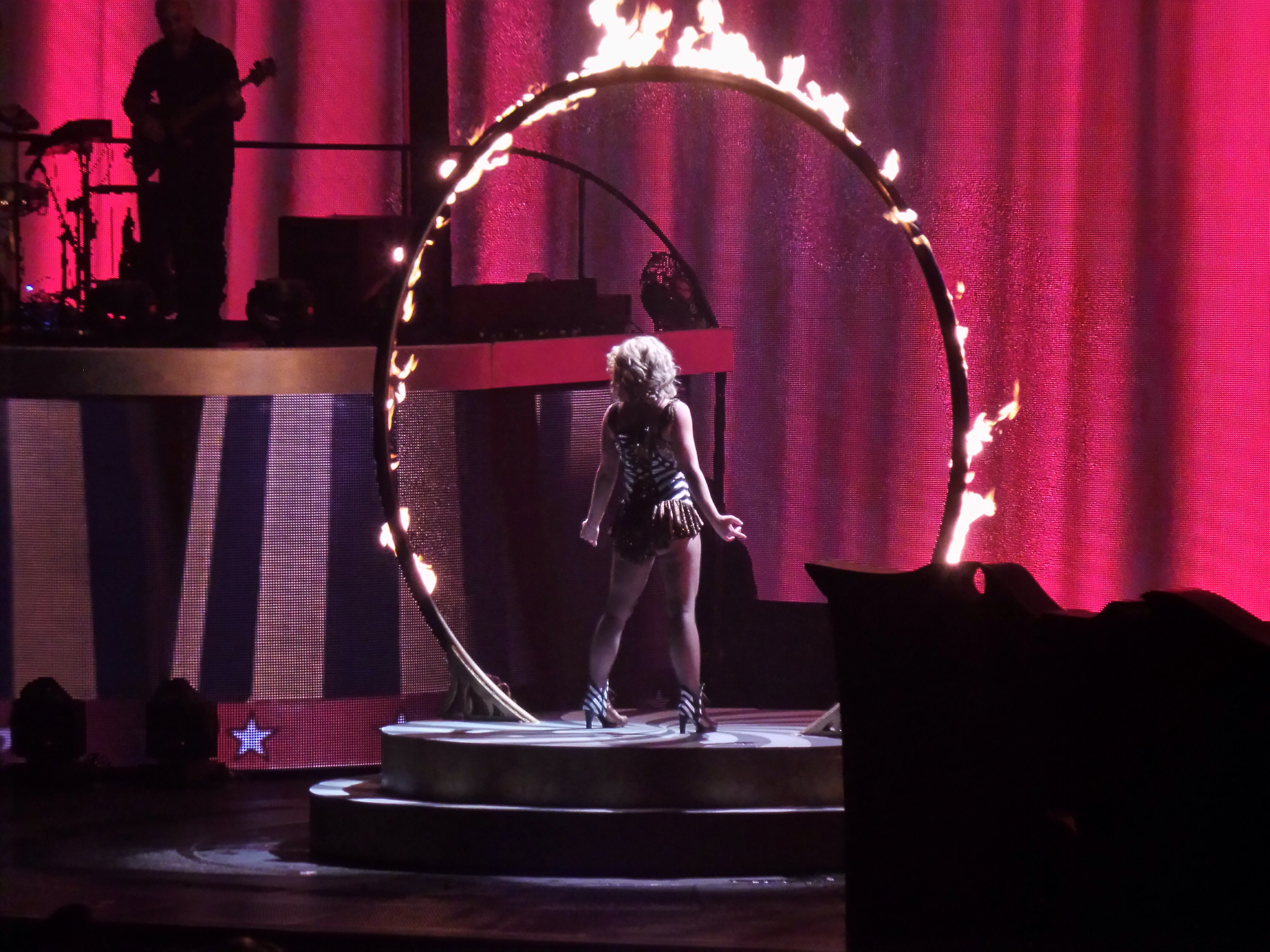
Spears performing "Circus" during her residency show, Britney: Piece of Me

"Circus" was performed on December 2, 2008, at American morning talk show Good Morning America, along with "Womanizer". She wore a midriff-baring shirt, leather pants, a ringmaster jacket and a top hat. "Circus" was a major part on the Circus Starring Britney Spears (2009), as the opening number of the show. The costumes of the performance were selected to show a metamorphosis. The show began with a video introduction featuring Perez Hilton as Queen Elizabeth I, welcoming the audience to the circus. In the middle of the video, the cylinder screen surrounding the stage started to rise, while Spears appeared on the video and shot Hilton with a crossbow, causing him to fall backwards onto the floor. As the video ended, Spears started to descend from the ceiling on a suspended platform, wearing a cheetah headdress, a ringmaster jacket, black shorts, high-heeled boots and carrying a whip. The headdress represented an animal. When she reached the stage, she took it off to represent both a ringmaster and a lion tamer and "Circus" started. It featured acrobats taking the stage and spinning on giant rings in the air. The performance ended with Spears taking off her ringleader jacket to reveal a Swarovski-crystal corset, representing a slave. She then ran into the center of the main stage, surrounded by jets of smoke, to enter a golden cage and perform "Piece of Me". People writer Chuck Arnold wrote that Spears, "descending from above in a red ringmaster-meets-dominatrix outfit" to sing the song, "showed that her body was tight, even if her dancing always wasn't." James Montgomery of MTV considered both "Circus" and "Radar" performances "great". Spears included the song on her residency show in Las Vegas, Britney: Piece of Me. For the performance, Spears appears from the back of the stage, in the center of a fiery ring, resembling a circus showgirl. Spears included the song on the set list for the Britney: Live in Concert (2017) and Piece of Me Tour (2018).

== Track listings and formats ==
- CD single
1. "Circus" – 3:12
2. "Womanizer" (Mike Rizzo Funk Generation Radio) – 3:51
- Maxi single
1. "Circus" – 3:12
2. "Circus" (Tom Neville's Ringleader remix) – 7:52
3. "Circus" (Diplo Circus remix) – 4:25
4. "Circus" (Junior Vasquez Club Circus) – 9:02
5. "Circus" (video) – 4:13
- Digital download - remix EP
1. "Circus" (Diplo Circus remix) – 4:25
2. "Circus" (Tom Neville's Ringleader remix) – 7:50
3. "Circus" (Villains remix) – 5:17
4. "Circus" (Linus Loves remix) – 4:39
5. "Circus" (Junior Vasquez Electric Circus) – 9:02
- Digital 45
1. "Circus" – 3:12
2. "Circus" (Tom Neville's Ringleader remix) – 7:52
- Digital download - Twister Rave remix
1. "Circus" (Twister Rave remix) – 3:32

== Credits and personnel ==
Credits and personnel are adapted from the Circus album liner notes.

- Lukasz "Dr. Luke" Gottwald – writer, producer, guitars, drums, keyboards, programming
- Claude Kelly – writer, background vocals
- Benny Blanco – writer, producer, drums, keyboards, programming
- Serban Ghenea – mixing
- John Hanes – additional Pro Tools engineering
- Tim Roberts – additional Pro Tools engineering assistance
- Emily Wright – recording, vocal editing
- Matt Beckley – recording, vocal editing
- Matt Beckley – recording
- Eric Weaver – recording assistant
- Chad Carlisle – recording assistant
- Chris Kasych – recording assistant
- Tatiana Gottwald – recording assistant
- Cathy Dennis – background vocals
- Myah Marie – background vocals

== Charts ==
=== Weekly charts ===
Chart (2008–2009)	Peak position
Australia (ARIA)	6
Austria (Ö3 Austria Top 40)	14
Belgium (Ultratop 50 Flanders)	37
Belgium (Ultratop 50 Wallonia)	27
Bulgaria (BAMP)	2
Canada Hot 100 (Billboard)	2
Canada CHR/Top 40 (Billboard)	1
Canada Hot AC (Billboard)	4
Chile (EFE)	9
CIS Airplay (TopHit)	29
Costa Rica (EFE)	10
Croatia International Airplay (HRT)	14
Czech Republic (Rádio Top 100)	41
Denmark (Tracklisten)	9
European Hot 100 Singles (Billboard)	12
European Radio Top 50 (Billboard)	8
Finland (Suomen virallinen lista)	15
France Download (SNEP)	16
Germany (Official German Charts)	11
Global Dance Tracks (Billboard)	3
Hungary (Editors' Choice Top 40)	18
Hungary (Single Top 40)	4
Ireland (IRMA)	12
Israel (Media Forest)	3
Japan Hot 100 (Billboard)	38
Mexico Anglo (Monitor Latino)	1
Netherlands (Dutch Top 40)	24
Netherlands (Single Top 100)	41
New Zealand (Recorded Music NZ)	4
Norway (VG-lista)	15
Russia Airplay (TopHit)	43
Scotland Singles (OCC)	6
Slovakia (Rádio Top 100)	13
Sweden (Sverigetopplistan)	6
Switzerland (Schweizer Hitparade)	19
Turkey Top 20 (Billboard)	1
Ukraine Airplay (TopHit)	14
UK Singles (OCC)	13
US Billboard Hot 100	3
US Adult Top 40 (Billboard)	24
US Dance Club Songs (Billboard)	3
US Pop Airplay (Billboard)	1
US Rhythmic Airplay (Billboard)	24

=== Year-end charts ===
Chart (2008)	Position
Australia (ARIA)	96

Chart (2009)	Position
Australia (ARIA)	62
Brazil (Crowley Broadcast Analysis)	11
Canada (Canadian Hot 100)	15
CIS (TopHit)	191
Croatia International Airplay (HRT)	89
Belgium (Ultratop 50 Wallonia)	87
Lebanon (NRJ)	34
Netherlands (Dutch Top 40)	119
Sweden (Sverigetopplistan)	78
UK Singles (OCC)	105
US Billboard Hot 100	27
US Mainstream Top 40 (Billboard)	13
US Digital Song Sales (Billboard)	17
World (IFPI Top Selling Digital Songs)	10

== Certifications and sales ==
Region	Certification	Certified units/sales
Australia (ARIA)	Platinum	70,000^{^}
Denmark (IFPI Danmark)	Gold	7,500^{^}
France	—	29,272
Germany (BVMI)	Gold	150,000^{‡}
New Zealand (RMNZ)	Platinum	30,000^{‡}
United Kingdom (BPI)	Platinum	600,000^{‡}
United States (RIAA)	5× Platinum	5,000,000^{‡}
Summaries
Worldwide (IFPI)	—	5,500,000
^{^} Shipments figures based on certification alone.^{‡} Sales+streaming figures based on certification alone.

== Release history ==
Region	Date	Version(s)	Format(s)	Label(s)	Ref.
United States	December 2, 2008	Original	Rhythmic contemporary	Jive	
Spain	February 17, 2009	Various	Digital download (EP)	Sony Music	
Germany	February 20, 2009	Various	Digital download (EP)	Sony Music	
France	February 23, 2009	Various	Digital download (remixes)	Jive	
Canada	February 24, 2009	Various	Digital download (remixes)	Sony Music	
Spain	February 24, 2009	Various	Digital download (remixes)	Sony Music	
United States	February 24, 2009	Various	Digital download (remixes)	Jive	
Germany	February 27, 2009	Various	CD; maxi	Sony Music	
United States	November 9, 2009	Various	Digital download (Digital 45)	Jive	
Canada	August 30, 2013	Twister Rave remix	Digital download	Sony Music	
France	August 30, 2013	Twister Rave remix	Digital download	Sony Music	
Germany	August 30, 2013	Twister Rave remix	Digital download	Sony Music	
United States	September 6, 2013	Twister Rave remix	Digital download	RCA	
