= Every =

Every may refer to:

== People ==
- Every (surname), including a list of people surnamed Every or Van Every
- Every Maclean, New Zealand politician in the 19th century
- Every baronets, a title in the Baronetage of England

== Other ==
- Suzuki Every, a kei truck produced by Japanese automaker Suzuki
- every, one of the English determiners

== See also ==
- Universal quantification, in predicate logic
- Each (disambiguation)
- Everybody (disambiguation)
- Everyone (disambiguation)
- Everything (disambiguation)
