= Piece of Me =

2007 single by Britney Spears

Single by Britney Spears

from the album Blackout
- Released: November 27, 2007
- Recorded: May–June 2007
- Studio: Bloodshy & Avant (Stockholm, Sweden); Chalice Recording (Los Angeles)
- Genre: Electropop; dance-pop; EDM-pop
- Length: 3:32
- Label: Jive; Zomba
- Songwriters: Christian Karlsson; Pontus Winnberg; Klas Åhlund
- Producer: Bloodshy & Avant

Britney Spears singles chronology
"Gimme More" (2007)	"Piece of Me" (2007)	"Break the Ice" (2008)

Music video
- "Piece of Me" on YouTube

"Piece of Me" is a song by American singer Britney Spears from her fifth studio album, Blackout (2007). It was released on November 27, 2007, by Jive Records as the second single from the album, but was actually the last song recorded. It was written and produced by Swedish producers Bloodshy & Avant and Klas Åhlund as a response to the media scrutiny and sensationalism of Spears's private life, which they had witnessed firsthand after working with her over the years. The song, acting as the singer's manifesto, has biographical lyrics retelling Spears's mishaps. It can be classified as an electropop, dance-pop and EDM-pop song that features an "electro instrumental track" and runs through a down-tempo dance beat. Spears's voice is heavily synthesized and her pitch constantly shifts; backing vocals are provided by Bloodshy & Avant and Robyn.

"Piece of Me" garnered widespread acclaim from the music critics with many deeming it as one of the highlights of Blackout. Rolling Stone ranked the song at number 15 on their list of the 100 Best Songs of 2007. It peaked at number 18 on the Billboard Hot 100 and became Spears's second single from the album to top the Billboard Hot Dance Club Play chart. "Piece of Me" was a global success, topping the charts in Costa Rica and Ireland and peaking within the top ten in twelve additional countries.

The music video to "Piece of Me", directed by Wayne Isham, portrays the state of Spears' life in 2007; it shows her and her friends disguising themselves in order to confuse the paparazzi, which ties directly to the lyrics. Director Isham's concept was to have Spears confidently parodying her situation. It received mixed reviews from critics, most arguing her body was digitally altered. The video, however, was nominated and won in three separate categories at the 2008 MTV Video Music Awards, including Video of the Year.

"Piece of Me" was performed on tour at the Circus Starring Britney Spears (2009) and the Femme Fatale Tour (2011). The song shares its title with Spears's Las Vegas residency show, Britney: Piece of Me (2013–2017), where it was also performed. The show went on to become a world tour, retaining the name, known as the Piece of Me Tour (2018).

== Background ==
"Piece of Me" was co-written and produced by the Swedish duo Christian Karlsson and Pontus Winnberg, professionally known as Bloodshy & Avant, along with Klas Åhlund. While recording with Spears over the years, Karlsson and Winnberg often saw first-hand how her regular activities were interrupted by the paparazzi, including one experience in Hamburg which Winnberg deemed "really scary". For Blackout, Spears worked with them on "Radar", "Freakshow" and "Toy Soldier". When the album was considered to be finished, Bloodshy & Avant were persuaded by her A&R Teresa LaBarbera Whites to work on a new track. Winnberg commented that it had always been an unwritten rule not to write songs about Spears's personal life since the label rejected "Sweet Dreams My LA Ex", a response track to Justin Timberlake's "Cry Me a River". However, the duo wrote "Piece of Me" with Åhlund and sent it to Spears, who loved it. Bloodshy & Avant worked on the track at Bloodshy & Avant Studios in Stockholm, Sweden, and Spears recorded her vocals at Chalice Recording Studios in Los Angeles, California. Winnberg stated that Spears was extremely psyched when she came to the studio, where she recorded the song in about half an hour as she had learned the lyrics by heart in her car. "Piece of Me" was later mixed by Niklas Flyckt at Mandarine Studios in Stockholm. On October 31, 2007, during a radio interview with Ryan Seacrest, Spears talked about the song, saying,

"Wherever you go, there's a lot of people who ask questions, and sometimes you don't know their intentions and stuff like that. So, it is kind of a cute way of putting it out there. You know, like, 'You want a piece of me?', you know, in a cool, cute and clever way. It is a cute song [...] I like it".

== Composition ==
"Piece of Me"
"Piece of Me" has an electropop sound with electronic fusions and accompanied by synthesizers.

"Piece of Me" is an electropop, dance-pop and EDM-pop song backed by an "electro instrumental track" and performed in an insistent pop groove. Sheet music for the song shows the key of C♯ minor with a time signature in common time. The melody runs through a down-tempo dance beat. Spears's vocals span over two octaves from D♯_{3} to D♯_{5}. They are heavily synthesized and are constantly pitch-shifted. The track begins with the sounds of a woman moaning. The track consists of over-the-top vocal distortions, causing a split sound effect, making it difficult to discern which voice is Spears's. Background vocals were also provided by Swedish pop singer Robyn. Christian Karlsson and Pontus Winnberg sing the line "Extra! Extra!" during the chorus and writer Klas Åhlund, along with Robyn, alternates the repeated "piece of me" line in robotized voices. Dave De Sylvia of Sputnikmusic drew comparisons to the songs in Robyn's Robyn (2005), specifically to her single "Handle Me".

The lyrics of "Piece of Me" are written as a reaction to the scrutiny of Spears's private life in the media. They deal with fame and living under the spotlight. During the first verse, Spears sings the hookline "You want a piece of me?", that is repeated throughout the song. According to Kelefa Sanneh of The New York Times, the line "could be an accusation or an invitation or a threat". "Piece of Me" is constructed in the common verse-chorus pattern. "Piece of Me" is written like a biography retelling Spears's mishaps, sung in a nearly spoken manner. Alex Fletcher of Digital Spy compared the lyrics to Amy Winehouse's "Rehab" (2006). Bill Lamb of About.com said that "Piece of Me" makes Michael Jackson's "Scream" (1995) "sound like a whimper."

== Critical reception ==
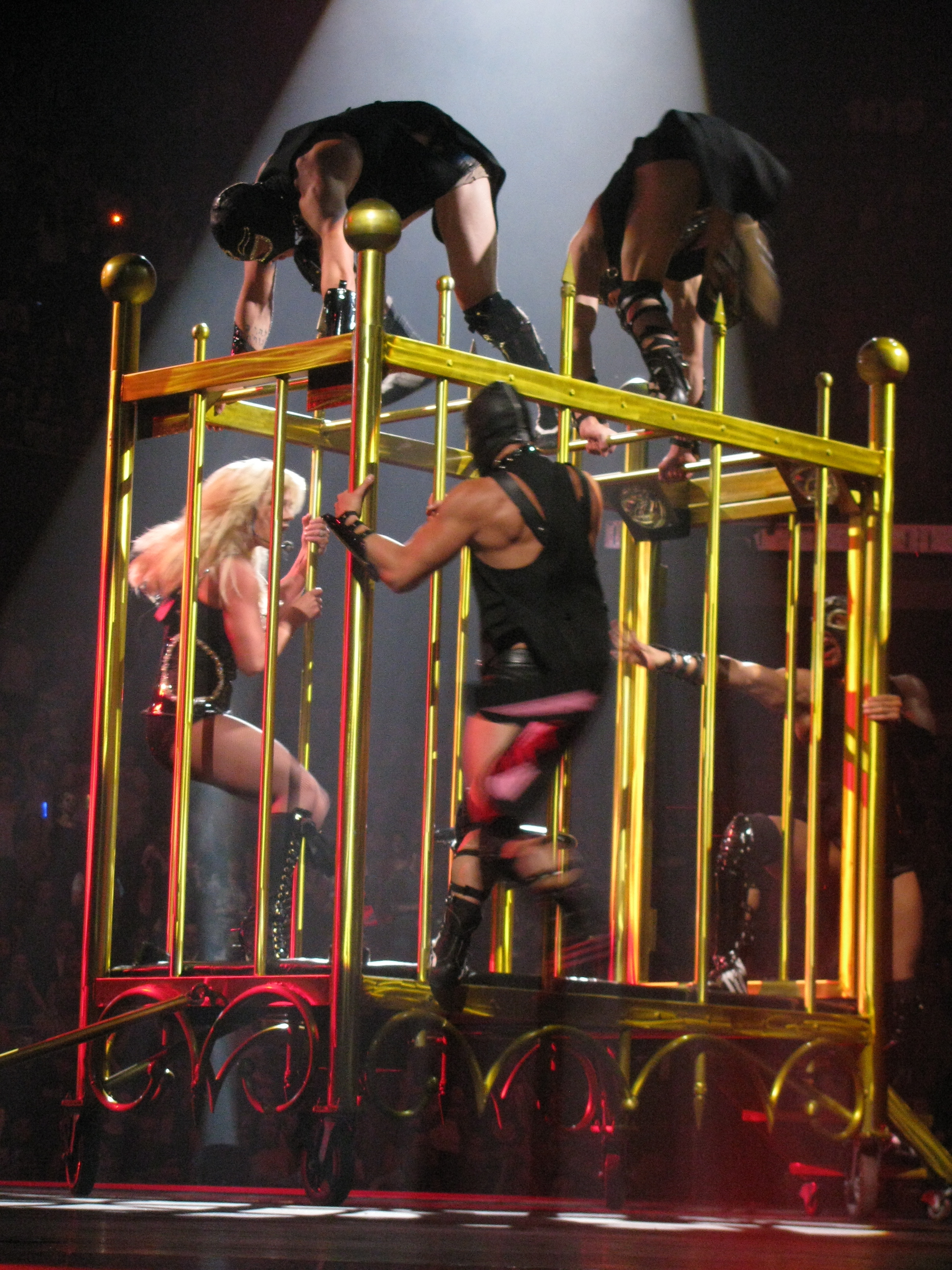
Spears and some of her dancers performing "Piece of Me" inside a cage during the Circus Starring Britney Spears

"Piece of Me" received widespread acclaim from music critics, most of whom considered it the standout track from Blackout. Alex Fletcher of Digital Spy gave "Piece of Me" four stars, calling it "a two fingered-salute to the media hounds and an electro-thudding cry of defiance, warning us that this popstrel is not for turning. [The opening line] poops from a great height on anything Lily Allen has ever penned and reveals that it's been Spears who's been laughing hardest during her year of zany media antics". Peter Robinson of The Observer and Margeaux Watson of Entertainment Weekly named "Piece of Me" one of the standout tracks of the album. Dennis Lim of Blender called it one of the best tracks of Blackout along with "Gimme More". Laura Herbert of BBC News said that the song is "without doubt the best track on the whole album. [...] It's a masterpiece." Kelefa Sanneh of The New York Times said "[Bloodshy & Avant] evoke the horror, the exhilaration and (finally) the boredom of [Spears's] overexamined life. It’s brilliant".

Tom Ewing of Pitchfork Media suggested that "the hypertreatment of the voice, the way it edges into the music, suggests that the price of fame is identity erasure. We understand her through a filter, and that's how we have to hear her too. The multiple backing vox fragment identity further, turn the song more universal". Dave De Sylvia of Sputnikmusic also picked it as one of the album's highlights. Melissa Maerz of Rolling Stone named it the best track of the album along with "Freakshow", deeming it as a "tabloid-bashing banger". Jim Abbott of the Orlando Sentinel said that "Musically, songs such as 'Piece of Me,' 'Radar' and 'Break the Ice' are one-dimensional, robotic exercises."

Stephen Thomas Erlewine of AllMusic commented that "Bloodshy & Avant try desperately to craft a defiant anthem for this tabloid fixture, as she couldn't be bothered to write one on her own". Chris Wasser from the Irish Independent said the song "drowns slowly under cloggy production and a lyrical theme that for all of its close connection with the trials and tribulations Spears has had to deal with, weren't even penned by the singer who could have very easily recorded her fairly unchallenging input on Blackout in less than a week." The song was later included in Rolling Stone's 100 Best Songs of 2007 list, at number fifteen. In 2024, Billboard's staff included "Piece of Me" on their "The 100 Greatest Songs About the Music Industry" list, ranking it at number nine.

== Chart performance ==
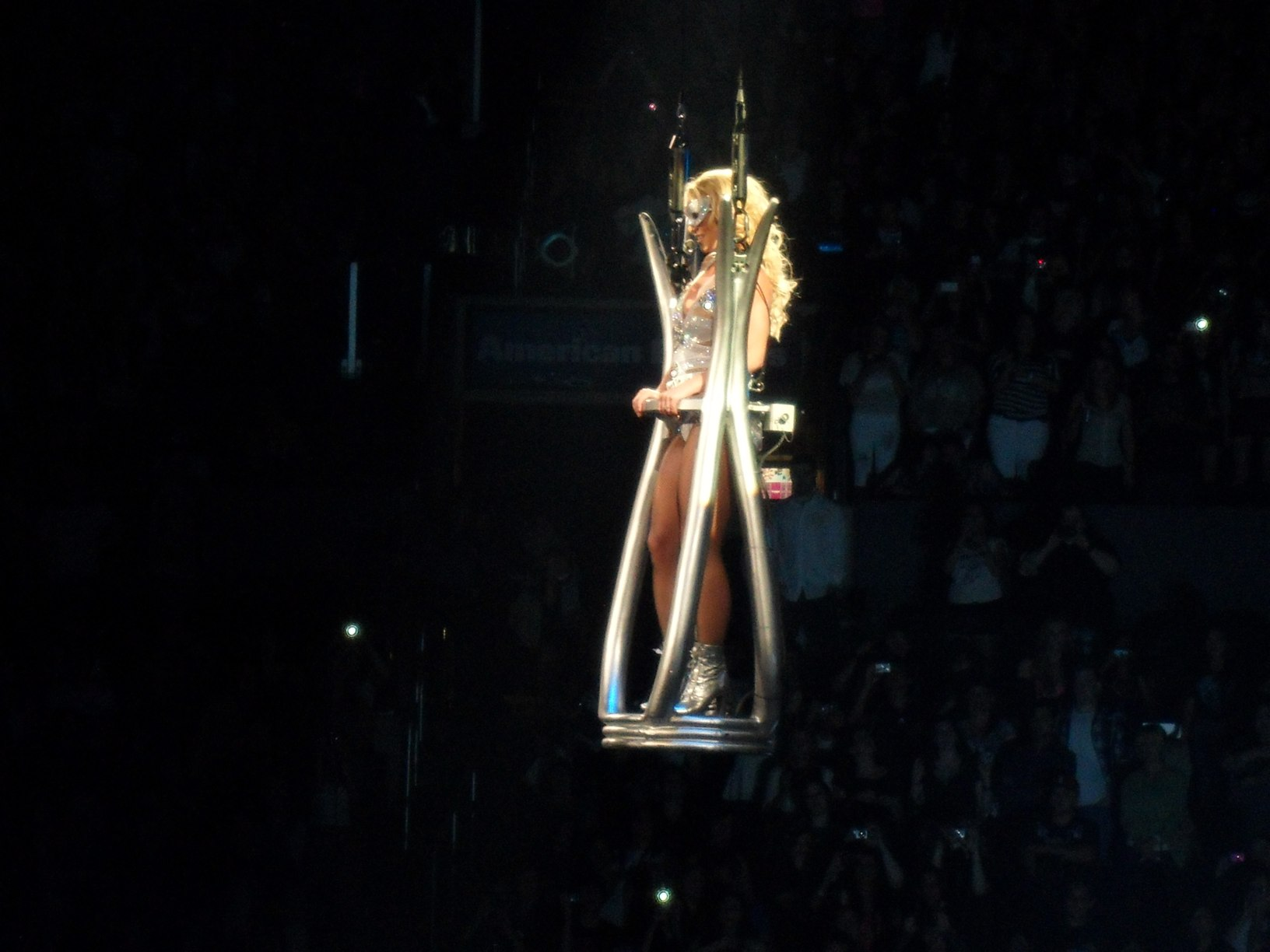
Spears performing "Piece of Me" at the Femme Fatale Tour

On November 17, 2007, "Piece of Me" debuted at number sixty-five on the U.S. Billboard Hot 100. On February 9, 2008, the song peaked at number 18. It was the second consecutive single from Blackout to reach number one on the Billboard Hot Dance Club Songs chart. The song shipped over 2,000,000 copies in the United States, earning a platinum certification by the Recording Industry Association of America (RIAA). As of March 2015, "Piece of Me" has sold 1.9 million digital downloads in the United States according to Nielsen SoundScan. It is her sixth best-selling digital single in the country. In Canada, the song debuted at number 37 on the Canadian Hot 100 for the week of November 17, 2007. For the week of April 26, 2008, it reached its peak position of number five. "Piece of Me" was certified platinum by the Canadian Recording Industry Association (CRIA) for paid digital downloads of 40,000.

In Australia, "Piece of Me" debuted at the ARIA Singles Chart at number two on February 4, 2008 – for the week ending date February 10, 2008. The song has shipped over 70,000 copies in Australia, earning a platinum certification by the Australian Recording Industry Association (ARIA). In New Zealand, the song debuted at number 34 on the New Zealand Singles Chart on December 31, 2007 – for the week ending date January 6, 2008. It was certified gold by the Recording Industry Association of New Zealand (RIANZ) for sales over 7,500 copies.

In the United Kingdom, "Piece of Me" debuted at number 69 on the UK Singles Chart on December 23, 2007 – for the week ending December 29, 2007. After its physical CD release, the song peaked at number two on the chart on January 13, 2008 – for the week ending date January 19, 2008. According to the Official Charts Company, the song has sold 276,000 copies in Britain. In Ireland, the song debuted at number 27 on the Irish Singles Chart on December 14, 2007 – for the week ending date December 20, 2007. It peaked at the top of the chart on January 4, 2008 – for the week ending date January 10, 2008 – where it remained for two consecutive weeks. "Piece of Me" achieved similar success across continental Europe, peaking inside the top ten in the European Hot 100 Singles chart, Austria, Denmark, Finland and Sweden and reaching the top forty in Belgium (Flanders and Wallonia), Czech Republic, Italy and the Netherlands.

== Music video ==
=== Development ===
The music video for "Piece of Me" was filmed on November 27 and 28, 2007, at the nightclub and restaurant Social Hollywood in Los Angeles, California. It was directed by Wayne Isham, who had previously worked with Spears on the music video of "I'm Not a Girl, Not Yet a Woman". In some scenes of the music video, Spears wore a purple satin dress from American designer Marina Toybina. Spears reportedly arrived twelve hours late to the set, after spending the day with her sons Sean Preston and Jayden James. Isham talked about the situation, saying, "She was late. People made a big thing about it, [but] how could she not be late, when you have 50, 65, 75 people running down the street chasing her car? That was a long day for the crew. It was literally a 20-hour day for the crew. She was there for the last six hours of it. She got there late, showed up and just kicked ass". He also explained the concept of the music video:

"On [the music video], I really just wanted to put the mirror back onto the whole experience. You can see that she had that kind of confidence. And, literally, every take became a more and more confident take, so that she could have fun with what was going on. Not being over-the-top sarcastic, but ... having a laugh at everything that was going on around her, with confidence. [...] The very last dance of the piece, she had her hair up, and I go, 'Can you just do one for me with your hair down?' She dropped her hair down. You'll see we intercut with her hair up and her hair down. That was the last piece. She just rocked it from her heart. She choreographed that last dance at the very end. She did that on her own and said, 'Let's go for it'".

=== Synopsis ===
Spears wearing a purple satin dress from American designer Marina Toybina

The video begins with four blonde women changing their clothes, putting make up on and dancing in a bedroom. Outside, several paparazzi are taking pictures of the situation through the window. Spears appears in front of a multi-colored, illuminated background wearing a short brown fur vest, a sequined black bra and ripped low-rise jeans. There are also intercut scenes of Spears wearing a white fur coat tearing down tabloid covers such as In Touch Weekly and creating positive ones, such as "It's Britney, Bitch" and "Exceptional Earner". One tabloid in particular is labeled Rats Weakly, likely a pun of Star when written backwards. During the first chorus, Spears joins the four women, all wearing matching blond bob wigs, dark sunglasses and black trench coats being hounded by paparazzi.

Then they enter a nightclub, with Spears wearing a purple satin dress. Spears starts flirting with a man and guides him into the women's bathroom, where she discovers he has a hidden camera in his chest. She writes "Sucker" in his forehead. There is a dance sequence until the song ends, in which Spears and the four women dance in the bathroom. At the end, the women are seen back at the bedroom watching an entertainment news program, in which the "Britney invasion" from earlier is reported. The final scene shows a close-up of Spears smirking.

=== Reception ===
The music video received mixed reviews from critics. The Daily Telegraph commented "Britney – presumably with the help of some serious digital remastering – has turned back the clock, looking every part the young starlet that gave us 'Oops'". Dose said "shockingly, it's not that bad. Well, not that bad for everyone's favourite panty protesting, deposition skipping, weave wearing pop-tard". On August 17, 2008, it was announced that the video was nominated for Best Female Video, Best Pop Video and Video of the Year at the 2008 MTV Video Music Awards. The ceremony was held on September 7, 2008, and Spears won all three categories. On October 18, 2008, during a live interview with New York's Z100, she explained that she was shocked when she won, saying, "It's a cool video, but I think by far I've done videos that are way better, so I was really shocked that it got [Video of the Year]. It was just inspiring, though, because now, going forward with the videos that I'm doing now, I can really go there and do something crazy and see what happens".

=== International version ===
An international version of the video was also officially released. This version is almost exactly the same as the original, with the only difference being that some of the early shots where Spears dances in front of the multicolored background are replaced by shots of Spears with a short blonde bob wig wearing a purple dress and in front of a black background with flashing lights.

=== MTV alternate video ===
On November 27, 2007, MTV launched the contest "Britney Spears Wants a Piece of You", in which fans could direct a separate video for the song, using footage of interviews and performances from Spears. Using the MTV Video Remixer, fans could mix and create a mash up of the footage. The winning video premiered on TRL on December 20, 2007, and MTV. Jive Records and Spears herself picked the winner. The winner also received a Haier Ibiza Rhapsody device along with a one-year subscription to Rhapsody, as well as Spears' entire discography released in the United States.

== Live performances ==
"Piece of Me" was performed at 2009's the Circus Starring Britney Spears as the second song of the show. At the end of the performance of "Circus", Spears took off her red jacket that represented a ringmaster, to reveal a black corset encrusted with Swarovski crystals, fishnet stockings and high-heeled laced up boots, designed by Dean and Dan Caten. While smoke surrounded her, she entered a cage in the middle of the stage while "Piece of Me" began. During the performance, Spears represented a slave, that attempted to escape from her dancers. "Piece of Me" was also performed at 2011's Femme Fatale Tour. Following "3", Spears climbed into a small platform and started performing the song while floating over the stage. The male dancers below her were dressed as policemen, and took off their shirts to reveal S&M bondage harnesses. Shirley Halperin of The Hollywood Reporter named it one of the best performances of the show along with "3" and "Don't Let Me Be the Last to Know", stating that "ironically enough, [they] were the ones with fewest frills." The song was also performed live at Spears's Las Vegas residency show, Britney: Piece of Me.

== Track listings ==
- CD single
1. "Piece of Me" (Album Version) – 3:32
2. "Piece of Me" (Böz o Lö Remix) – 4:53
- German limited edition CD single – CD1
1. "Piece of Me" (Album Version) – 3:32
2. "Piece of Me" (Tiësto Radio Edit) – 3:23
- German limited edition CD single – CD2
1. "Piece of Me" (Album Version) – 3:32
2. "Piece of Me" (Junior Vasquez and Johnny Vicious Radio Edit) – 3:38
- CD maxi single
1. "Piece of Me" (Album Version) – 3:32
2. "Piece of Me" (Böz o Lö Remix) – 4:53
3. "Piece of Me" (Bimbo Jones Remix) – 6:26
4. "Piece of Me" (Vito Benito Remix) – 6:46
5. "Gimme More" ("Kimme More" Remix featuring Lil' Kim) – 4:14
- Digital download – Remixes
1. "Piece of Me" — 3:32
2. "Piece of Me" (Böz o Lö Remix) – 4:53
3. "Piece of Me" (Tiësto Radio Edit) – 3:23
4. "Piece of Me" (Junior Vasquez and Johnny Vicious Radio Edit) – 3:38
5. "Piece of Me" (Friscia & Lamboy Radio Edit) – 3:27
6. "Piece of Me" (Sly & Robbie Reggae Remix featuring Cherine Anderson) – 4:16
- Digital download – Digital 45
1. "Piece of Me" – 3:31
2. "Piece of Me" (Bloodshy & Avant's Böz o Lö Remix) – 4:53

== Credits and personnel ==
Credits and personnel are adapted from the Blackout album liner notes.

- Christian Karlsson – writer, producer, recording, keyboards, programming, bass, guitar
- Pontus Winnberg – writer, producer, recording, keyboards, programming, bass, guitar
- Klas Åhlund – writer, additional bass
- Niklas Flyckt – mixing
- Henrik Jonback – additional guitar
- Robyn Carlsson – background vocals
- Tom Coyne – mastering

== Charts ==
=== Weekly charts ===
Weekly chart performance for "Piece of Me"
Chart (2007–2008)	Peak position
Australia (ARIA)	2
Austria (Ö3 Austria Top 40)	6
Belgium (Ultratop 50 Flanders)	36
Belgium (Ultratop 50 Wallonia)	36
Canada Hot 100 (Billboard)	5
Canada CHR/Top 40 (Billboard)	2
Canada Hot AC (Billboard)	34
Chile (EFE)	2
CIS Airplay (TopHit)	6
Costa Rica (EFE)	1
Czech Republic Airplay (ČNS IFPI)	19
Denmark (Tracklisten)	4
European Hot 100 Singles (Billboard)	6
Finland (Suomen virallinen lista)	8
France Airplay (SNEP)	39
Germany (GfK)	7
Global Dance Tracks (Billboard)	4
Hungary (Dance Top 40)	27
Hungary (Editors' Choice Top 40)	38
Iceland (Tónlistinn)	12
Ireland (IRMA)	1
Italy (FIMI)	11
Mexico (Top 20 – Inglés)	20
Netherlands (Dutch Top 40 Tipparade)	4
Netherlands (Single Top 100)	41
New Zealand (Recorded Music NZ)	4
Romania (Romanian Top 100)	18
Russia Airplay (TopHit)	16
Scottish Singles Sales (Official Charts)	2
Slovakia Airplay (ČNS IFPI)	10
Sweden (Sverigetopplistan)	9
Switzerland (Schweizer Hitparade)	19
UK Singles (Official Charts)	2
US Billboard Hot 100	18
US Dance Club Songs (Billboard)	1
US Pop Airplay (Billboard)	28

=== Year-end charts ===
2007 year-end chart performance for "Piece of Me"
Chart (2007)	Position
Lebanon (NRJ)	78

2008 year-end chart performance "Piece of Me"
Chart (2008)	Position
Australia (ARIA)	38
Austria (Ö3 Austria Top 40)	39
Belgium (Ultratop 50 Wallonia)	100
Brazil (Crowley Broadcast Analysis)	41
Canada (Canadian Hot 100)	30
CIS (TopHit)	73
European Hot 100 Singles (Billboard)	39
Germany (Media Control GfK)	59
Ireland (IRMA)	17
New Zealand (RIANZ)	28
Russia Airplay (TopHit)	104
Sweden (Sverigetopplistan)	68
Switzerland (Schweizer Hitparade)	87
UK Singles (OCC)	47
US Billboard Hot 100	83
US Dance Club Play (Billboard)	37

== Certifications and sales ==
Certifications and sales for "Piece of Me"
Region	Certification	Certified units/sales
Australia (ARIA)	Platinum	70,000^{^}
Canada (Music Canada) Mastertone	Platinum	40,000^{*}
Denmark (IFPI Danmark)	Platinum	15,000^{^}
Germany (BVMI)	Gold	150,000^{‡}
Italy (FIMI)	—	11,002
New Zealand (RMNZ)	Platinum	15,000^{*}
Sweden (GLF)	Gold	10,000^{^}
United Kingdom (BPI)	Gold	427,000
United States (RIAA)	2× Platinum	2,000,000^{‡}
^{*} Sales figures based on certification alone.^{^} Shipments figures based on certification alone.^{‡} Sales+streaming figures based on certification alone.

== Release history ==
Release dates and formats for "Piece of Me"
Region	Date	Format(s)	Label(s)	Ref.
United States	November 27, 2007	Contemporary hit radio	Jive	
Spain	January 1, 2008	Digital download (EP)	Sony BMG	
Ireland	January 4, 2008	Digital download	Sony BMG	
Norway	January 4, 2008	Digital download	Sony BMG	
Finland	January 7, 2008	Digital download	Sony BMG	
Singapore	January 7, 2008	Digital download	Sony BMG	
United Kingdom	January 7, 2008	Digital download	RCA	
United Kingdom	January 8, 2008	CD	RCA	
Italy	January 11, 2008	Digital download (EP)	Sony BMG	
Luxembourg	January 14, 2008	Digital download	Sony BMG	
Sweden	January 14, 2008	Digital download (EP)	Sony BMG	
United States	January 29, 2008	Digital download (EP)	Jive	
Germany	February 1, 2008	CD; digital download; maxi CD	Sony BMG	
United Kingdom	February 4, 2008	Maxi CD	RCA	
Germany	February 29, 2008	CD (limited edition)	Sony BMG	
Japan	March 18, 2008	CD	Sony BMG	

== See also ==
- List of most expensive music videos
