= Everybody Sing =

Everybody Sing may refer to:

- Everybody, Sing!, 2021 Philippine game show
- Everybody Sing (film), 1938 American film
- "Everybody Sing" (Judy Garland song), 1938 song by Judy Garland

== See also ==
- Everybody (disambiguation)
- Sing (disambiguation)
