= Everybody =

Everybody may refer to:

== Music ==
=== Albums ===
- Everybody (Chris Janson album) or the title song, 2017
- Everybody (Gods Child album), 1994
- Everybody (Hear'Say album), 2001
- Everybody (Ingrid Michaelson album) or the title song, 2009
- Everybody (Logic album) or the title song (see below), 2017
- Everybody (The Sea and Cake album), 2007
- Everybody (EP), by Shinee, or the title song (see below), 2013

=== Songs ===
- "Everybody" (Britney Spears song), 2007
- "Everybody" (DJ BoBo song), 1994
- "Everybody" (Justice Crew song), 2013
- "Everybody" (Logic song), 2017
- "Everybody" (Keith Urban song), 2007
- "Everybody" (Kinky song), 1996
- "Everybody" (Hear'Say song), 2001
- "Everybody" (Madonna song), 1982
- "Everybody" (Martin Solveig song), 2005
- "Everybody" (Nicki Minaj song), 2023
- "Everybody" (Rudenko song), 2009
- "Everybody" (Shinee song), 2013
- "Everybody" (Stabilo song), 2001
- "Everybody" (Tanel Padar and Dave Benton song), representing Estonia at Eurovision 2001
- "Everybody" (Tommy Roe song), 1963
- "Everybody (Backstreet's Back)", by Backstreet Boys, 1997
- "Everybody" (¥$ song), 2023
- "Everybody", by Ghastly from The Mystifying Oracle, 2018
- "Everybody", by the Jacksons from Triumph, 1980
- "Everybody", by Mac Miller from Circles, 2020
- "Everybody", by Nicole Scherzinger from Killer Love, 2011

== Other uses ==
- Everybody (play), a 2017 play by Branden Jacobs-Jenkins updating the medieval morality play Everyman
- Everybody (political party), a Chilean political party
- Every Body, 2023 documentary film about the lives of intersex people

== See also ==
- Everyone (disambiguation)
- Everybody Everybody (disambiguation)
- Indefinite pronoun
