= Break the Ice (song) =

2008 single by Britney Spears

Single by Britney Spears

from the album Blackout
- B-side: "Everybody"
- Released: March 3, 2008
- Recorded: August–October 2006
- Studio: Studio at the Palms (Las Vegas, Nevada)
- Genre: Electro-R&B
- Length: 3:16
- Label: Jive
- Songwriters: Nate Hills; James Washington; Keri Hilson; Marcella Araica
- Producers: Danja; Jim Beanz

Britney Spears singles chronology
| "Piece of Me" (2007) | "Break the Ice" (2008) | "Womanizer" (2008) |

Music video
- "Break the Ice" on YouTube

"Break the Ice" is a song by American singer Britney Spears from her fifth studio album, Blackout (2007). It was released as the third and final single from the album on March 3, 2008, by Jive Records. The song was written by Nate "Danja" Hills, Jim Beanz, Keri Hilson and Marcella Araica, while production was handled by Danja and vocal production was handled by Beanz. "Radar" was originally planned to be released as the third single, but "Break the Ice" was released after it was chosen by a poll on Spears's official website. Musically, "Break the Ice" is an electro-R&B song with influences of crunk. The song opens with a choir and features synthesizers. Its lyrics deal with an attraction between two people. "Break the Ice" received critical acclaim, with reviewers praising its lyrics, production, Spears' vocal performance and deemed it a strong electronic song from the record.

"Break the Ice" was a moderate success, reaching the top ten in Canada and Finland, and charting within the top 40 in Australia, New Zealand and many other European countries. In the United States, the single reached number 43 on the Billboard Hot 100, while peaking at number one on the Dance Club Songs chart. An accompanying music video, directed by Robert Hales, was released on March 12, 2008. The anime-influenced animation video was based on the superheroine character of Spears's "Toxic" video, and portrays her destroying a highly secured laboratory with several clones, including one of herself. A remix of "Break the Ice" was used as a video interlude during The Circus Starring Britney Spears (2009) and was performed for the first time during her residency show at Planet Hollywood Las Vegas, Britney: Piece of Me (2013–17).

== Background ==
"Break the Ice" was written by Nate "Danja" Hills, Marcella "Ms. Lago" Araica, Keri Hilson, James Washington and produced by Danja. Spears started working with Danja in July 2006. He explained that the creative process was not difficult at first since he was "left to do pretty much whatever I wanted to", and "if she felt it, she was gonna ride with it. If she didn't, you’d see it in her face." Spears began recording the track in Las Vegas in August 2006, while she was seven months pregnant with her second child, Jayden James. Recording continued at Spears' house in Los Angeles, California, three weeks after she gave birth. Hilson commented that "She gave 150 percent. [...] I don’t know any other mother that would do that." "Radar" was originally planned to be released as the third single from Blackout, according to Ezekiel Lewis of The Clutch. "Break the Ice" was chosen as a single by a poll on Spears' official Jive Records website. On February 11, 2008, it was announced that the song had won, receiving 39% of the total votes.

== Composition ==
"Break the Ice"
This clip features the electro chorus accompanied by synthesizers. After the chorus, the bridge begins with Spears saying "I like this part" mimicking Janet Jackson in "Nasty" (1986).

"Break the Ice" is an electro-R&B song with influences of crunk. According to Leah Greenblatt of Entertainment Weekly, "Break the Ice" sounds similar to "Say It Right" by Nelly Furtado. It opens with Spears singing the lines "It's been a while / I know I shouldn't have kept you waiting / But I'm here now", which serve as an apology for being gone so long from the music industry as well as away from her love interest in the song. After the first line, Spears sings over a choir. According to Chuck Arnold of People, Spears delivers her "trademark breathy vocals". In the first verse, synthesizers kick in and run until the end of the second chorus. After it, Spears stops the song and sings "I like this part / It feels kind of good", mimicking Janet Jackson in "Nasty" (1986). The music changes, as described by Tom Ewing of Pitchfork Media, to "[something that] sounds like spacehoppers [are] bouncing in slow motion round a padded cell". The song is constructed in the common verse-chorus form. Lyrically, the song is about two people, in which one of them asks the other to get to know each other and break the ice.

== Critical reception ==
Eric R. Danton of The Hartford Courant deemed it as a "crunk-style thumper", while calling it one of the "killer tracks" off the album along with "Radar" and "Hot as Ice". Nick Levine of Digital Spy called it "a booming slice of multi-layered electro R&B" and said that it, along with "Radar", is "as avant-garde as pop gets in 2007". A reviewer from Popjustice said "[it] is a really brilliant track", Stephen Thomas Erlewine of AllMusic said some of the songs of Blackout, "really show off the skills of the producers", exemplifying "Gimme More", "Radar", "Break the Ice", "Heaven on Earth" and "Hot as Ice". He also referred to the song as a "stuttering electro-clip".

Jennifer Vineyard of MTV said the song "might have been a stronger album leadoff track than 'Gimme More', [...] since [Spears] re-introduces herself at the top and apologizes for being gone for so long." Kelefe Sanneh of The New York Times said the song was "nearly as good" as previous singles "Gimme More" and "Piece of Me", and described it as a "rave-inspired flirtation". A reviewer from the Ottawa Citizen said that "[t]here's also a lot to like about Break The Ice, Why Should I Be Sad and Perfect Love[r]". Jim Abbott of the Orlando Sentinel said that "Musically, songs such as 'Piece of Me,' 'Radar' and 'Break the Ice' are one-dimensional, robotic exercises." Joan Anderman of The Boston Globe called it "numbing club filler."

== Chart performance ==
In the United States, "Break the Ice" entered the Billboard Hot 100 at number 100 on the issue dated March 15, 2008. It peaked at number 43 on May 24, 2008. Two weeks later, it peaked atop the Billboard Hot Dance Club Songs, becoming the third consecutive single from the album to reach the top position of the chart. As of July 2010, "Break the Ice" has sold 688,000 paid digital downloads in the United States. In Canada, the song entered the Canadian Hot 100 at number 97 on March 1, 2008. On April 26, 2008, it reached its peak position of number nine. On May 5, 2008, the track debuted at number 41 on the Australian ARIA Singles Chart. It peaked at number 23 on the issue dated May 19, 2008. In New Zealand, the single debuted at number 37 on April 7, 2008. It peaked at number 24 three weeks later. "Break the Ice" entered the UK Singles Chart at number 36 on March 31, 2008. On April 20, 2008, it peaked at number 15. The song also had moderate success through Europe, reaching the top ten in Belgium (Flanders and Wallonia) and Finland, and the top twenty in Denmark and Sweden. In Denmark, it was certified gold by the International Federation of the Phonographic Industry (IFPI) for sales over 7,500 copies.

== Music video ==
The anime-influenced version of Spears in the music video

Originally, the remix with Fabolous was initially to be released as the album's third single and have a music video with a chair dancing sequence similar to the video for Spears' 2000 single "Stronger". However, due to her personal life struggles at the time, this idea was cancelled and Spears came up with the idea for creating an animated video instead.

The music video for "Break the Ice" was directed by Robert Hales. It was created with an anime-influenced animation style and was produced by a South Korean animation studio called "Studio Animal". Hong Seong-gun, an animator who participated in the production, included his son's name ("홍치우" and "CHIWOO"), which can be seen throughout the video. It premiered on March 12, 2008 at BlackoutBall.com, a website created exclusively for the premiere, in which fans could access a chat room.

The video begins with Spears wearing a short black bodysuit and knee-high black boots, standing on the roofs of a futuristic city. As the first verse begins, she breaks into a research facility and battles with suited henchmen. Spears ends up gaining access to a highly secured laboratory and walks through aisles of clones held in liquid cocoons. She sees that one is a clone of her, kisses her and plants a bomb on the tank. After this, Spears infiltrates the base of the apparent villain, kissing him, and then destroying him, revealing him to be a robot also. From there, she dodges a bullet and sets off a panic among the newly arrived henchmen, meanwhile the bomb's timer runs lower and lower. Next, there is a wide shot of the building exploding, while Spears is jumping and "Victory" is depicted on the side of the structure. The video ends with the phrase "To be continued...".

== Live performances ==
A remix of "Break the Ice" was used as a video interlude during The Circus Starring Britney Spears (2009). The song was performed for the first time in 2013, during Spears' Las Vegas residency Britney: Piece of Me. Halfway through the performance of "Gimme More", Spears and her dancers, wearing cowboy-inspired plaid and denim outfits, performed a fragment of "Break the Ice", which was then followed by a dance routine which pays tribute to Michael Jackson and then "Piece of Me". In the revamp of the concert in 2016, the song was moved to the first act of the show with a different choreography. Spears also performed it during her concert at the 2016 Apple Music Festival on September 27, 2016.

According to rehearsal videos published at Spears' social media accounts in late 2018, "Break the Ice" was set to be performed at her planned residency Britney: Domination prior to its cancellation.

== Track listings and formats ==
- CD single
1. "Break the Ice" – 3:16
2. "Everybody" – 3:16
- CD maxi single
1. "Break the Ice" – 3:16
2. "Break the Ice" (Kaskade Remix) – 5:28
3. "Break the Ice" (Tracy Young Mix) – 6:32
4. "Break the Ice" (Tonal Remix) – 4:52
5. "Break the Ice" (Video Enhancement) – 3:22
- 12-inch vinyl – The Remixes
1. "Break the Ice" (Kaskade Remix) – 5:28
2. "Break the Ice" (Jason Nevins Rock Remix) – 3:18
3. "Break the Ice" (Tonal Remix) – 4:52
4. "Break the Ice" (Mike Rizzo Funk Generation Dub) – 7:14
5. "Break the Ice" (Tracy Young Club Mix) – 8:51
6. "Break the Ice" (Doug Grayson Remix) – 4:43
- Digital download – EP
1. "Break the Ice" – 3:16
2. "Break the Ice" (Jason Nevins Rock Remix) – 3:16
3. "Break the Ice" (Kaskade Remix) – 5:28
- Digital download – Remixes
1. "Break the Ice" (Jason Nevins Extended) – 6:18
2. "Break the Ice" (Jason Nevins Dub) – 6:57
3. "Break the Ice" (Mike Rizzo Generation Club Mix) – 6:41
4. "Break the Ice" (Mike Rizzo Generation Dub) – 7:14
5. "Break the Ice" (Tracy Young Club Mix) – 8:50
6. "Break the Ice" (Tracy Young Dub) – 8:28

== Credits and personnel ==
Credits for "Break the Ice" are taken from Blackout's liner notes.

- Britney Spears – lead vocals
- Nate "Danja" Hills – songwriting, production
- Marcella Araica – songwriting, instruments, programming, mixing
- Keri Hilson – recording, songwriting, background vocals
- James Washington – songwriting
- Jim Beanz – background vocals

== Charts ==
=== Weekly charts ===
Weekly chart performance for "Break the Ice"
| Chart (2008) | Peak position |
|---|---|
| Australia (ARIA) | 23 |
| Australian Dance (ARIA) | 1 |
| Austria (Ö3 Austria Top 40) | 39 |
| Belgium (Ultratip Bubbling Under Flanders) | 7 |
| Belgium (Ultratip Bubbling Under Wallonia) | 3 |
| Canada Hot 100 (Billboard) | 9 |
| Canada CHR/Top 40 (Billboard) | 8 |
| Canada Hot AC (Billboard) | 15 |
| Chile (EFE) | 9 |
| CIS Airplay (TopHit) | 30 |
| Czech Republic Airplay (ČNS IFPI) | 15 |
| Denmark (Tracklisten) | 13 |
| El Salvador (EFE) | 2 |
| Euro Digital Songs (Billboard) | 14 |
| European Hot 100 Singles (Billboard) | 31 |
| Finland (Suomen virallinen lista) | 8 |
| Germany (GfK) | 25 |
| Global Dance Tracks (Billboard) | 6 |
| Ireland (IRMA) | 7 |
| Netherlands (Dutch Top 40 Tipparade) | 4 |
| Netherlands (Single Top 100) | 61 |
| New Zealand (Recorded Music NZ) | 24 |
| Romania (Romanian Top 100) | 17 |
| Russia Airplay (TopHit) | 61 |
| Scottish Singles Sales (Official Charts) | 16 |
| Slovakia (Rádio Top 100) | 22 |
| Sweden (Sverigetopplistan) | 11 |
| Switzerland (Schweizer Hitparade) | 63 |
| Turkey (Billboard) | 11 |
| UK Singles (Official Charts) | 15 |
| UK Hip Hop/R&B (Official Charts) | 4 |
| US Billboard Hot 100 | 43 |
| US Dance Club Songs (Billboard) | 1 |
| US Dance Airplay (Billboard) | 5 |
| US Pop Airplay (Billboard) | 21 |

=== Year-end charts ===
Year-end chart performance for "Break the Ice"
| Chart (2008) | Position |
|---|---|
| Australian Dance (ARIA) | 17 |
| Brazil (Crowley Broadcast Analysis) | 76 |
| Canada (Canadian Hot 100) | 58 |
| CIS (TopHit) | 118 |
| Lebanon (NRJ) | 74 |
| Russia Airplay (TopHit) | 185 |
| Sweden (Sverigetopplistan) | 76 |
| UK Singles (OCC) | 124 |
| US Hot Dance Airplay (Billboard) | 16 |

== Certifications ==
Certifications for "Break the Ice"
| Region | Certification | Certified units/sales |
|---|---|---|
| Denmark (IFPI Danmark) | Gold | 7,500^{^} |
| United Kingdom (BPI) | Silver | 200,000^{‡} |
| United States (RIAA) | Platinum | 1,000,000^{‡} |
^{^} Shipments figures based on certification alone.^{‡} Sales+streaming figures based on certification alone.

== Release history ==
Release dates and formats for "Break the Ice"
| Region | Date | Format(s) | Label(s) | Ref. |
|---|---|---|---|---|
| United States | March 3, 2008 | Contemporary hit radio; rhythmic contemporary radio | Jive | |
| Italy | March 21, 2008 | Digital download | Sony BMG | |
| Spain | March 21, 2008 | Digital download | Sony BMG | |
| United Kingdom | March 21, 2008 | Digital download | RCA | |
| Ireland | April 4, 2008 | Digital download (EP) | Sony BMG | |
| Netherlands | April 4, 2008 | Digital download (EP) | Sony BMG | |
| Finland | April 7, 2008 | Digital download (EP) | Sony BMG | |
| Norway | April 7, 2008 | Digital download (EP) | Sony BMG | |
| Spain | April 7, 2008 | Digital download (EP) | Sony BMG | |
| United Kingdom | April 7, 2008 | Digital download (EP) | RCA | |
| United Kingdom | April 14, 2008 | CD | RCA | |
| Germany | May 2, 2008 | CD | Sony BMG | |
| Germany | May 2, 2008 | Maxi CD | Sony BMG | |
| New Zealand | May 10, 2008 | Digital download | Sony BMG | |
| Luxembourg | May 30, 2008 | Digital download | Sony BMG | |
| Various | July 29, 2008 | Digital download (remixes) | Jive | |
