= Everyone =

Everyone may refer to:

== Songs ==
- "Everyone" (Olympics song), official theme song of the 2010 Summer Youth Olympics
- "Everyone" (Van Morrison song), 1970
- "Everyone", by Adema from Adema, 2001
- "Everyone", by Backstreet Boys from Black & Blue, 2000
- "Everyone", by Crazy Frog from Everybody Dance Now, 2009
- "Everyone", by Mitski from Laurel Hell, 2022

== Television ==
- Five episodes of the British series Skins:
  - "Everyone" (Skins series 1), 2007
  - "Everyone" (Skins series 3), 2009
  - "Everyone" (Skins series 4), 2010
  - "Everyone" (Skins series 5), 2011
  - "Everyone" (Skins series 6), 2012
- Everyone TV, a British television communications company

== Other uses ==
- Everyone (film), a 2004 Canadian film directed by Bill Marchant
- EveryOne Group, an Italian non-governmental human rights organization
- Everyone, a video-game rating assigned by the Entertainment Software Rating Board

== See also ==
- Everybody (disambiguation)
- Indefinite pronoun
