= Each =

Each may refer to:

- each, a determiner and indefinite pronoun in the English language
- Educational Action Challenging Homophobia, a UK charitable organisation
- East Anglia's Children's Hospices, an English hospice charity

== See also ==
- Every (disambiguation)
- For each (disambiguation)
