= For each =

For each may refer to:

- In mathematics, Universal quantification. Also read as: "for all"
- In computer science, foreach loop

== See also ==
- Each (disambiguation)
