= Promises Treatment Centers =

American for-profit rehabilitation provider

Coordinates: 34.0439°N 118.6213°W

- Company type: Private
- Industry: Rehabilitation
- Headquarters: Brentwood, Tennessee, United States
- Website: Promises.com

Promises Treatment Centers are a for-profit provider of residential drug and alcohol rehabilitation that started out with facilities in Malibu and West Los Angeles, California.

== History ==
It was founded by Richard Rogg in 1989 and acquired by David Sack of Elements Behavioral Health in 2008. Elements filed for bankruptcy in 2018. They operate locations in areas other than California; however, the California locations have closed.

For its treatment method, Promises used the term "Malibu Model" which it registered in 2004 as a service mark. The Malibu Model differs from traditional models by allowing patients more liberty and providing privatized treatment, in contrast to regular rehab involving peer groups, never leaving the facility, and limited visitors.
