= EveryOne Group =

Non-governmental human rights organization

- Formation: 2006
- Founders: Roberto Malini; Dario Picciau; Matteo Pegoraro; Glenys Robinson
- Type: Non-governmental human rights organization
- Purpose: Human rights, protecting migrants, asylum seekers, refugees, Roma and Sinti and LGBT people
- Region served: Italy
- Leader: Roberto Malini
- Website: http://www.everyonegroup.com/EveryOne/MainPage/MainPage.html

EveryOne Group is a non-governmental human rights organization that was set up in 2006 when some human rights defenders got together and developed new civilian tools to protect migrants, asylum seekers, refugees, Roma and Sinti, LGBT people, and others discriminated and persecuted social groups.

EveryOne Group often works in contact with the United Nations High Commissioners for Refugees and Human Rights, UNICEF, the European Parliament and a number of governments. Roberto Malini, Dario Picciau and Glenys Robinson are the group presidents.

EveryOne Group is also dedicated to the fight against human trafficking and promotes a culture of equality and tolerance, against racism, anti-semitism and homophobia.
