= Everybody Everybody (disambiguation) =

"Everybody Everybody" is a 1990 song by the Italian house music group Black Box.

Everybody Everybody may also refer to:

- Everybody Everybody (album), a 1999 compilation album by Brazilian heavy metal band Viper
- "Everybody Everybody", a 2021 non-album song by Faithless
