= Blackout (Britney Spears album) =

2007 studio album by Britney Spears

Studio album by Britney Spears
- Released: October 25, 2007
- Recorded: March 2006 – June 2007
- Studios: Bloodshy & Avant (Stockholm); Chalice (Los Angeles); Conway (Los Angeles); Record Plant (Los Angeles); Silent Sound (Atlanta); Sony (New York); South Beach (Miami); Studio at the Palms (Las Vegas)
- Genres: Dance-pop; electropop; techno; avant-disco
- Length: 43:37
- Label: Jive
- Producers: Bloodshy & Avant; The Clutch; Danja; Kara DioGuardi; Freescha; Fredwreck; The Neptunes; J.R. Rotem

Britney Spears chronology
B in the Mix: The Remixes (2005)	Blackout (2007)	Circus (2008)

Singles from Blackout
- 1. "Gimme More" Released: August 31, 2007; 2. "Piece of Me" Released: November 27, 2007; 3. "Break the Ice" Released: March 3, 2008

Blackout is the fifth studio album by American singer Britney Spears. It was released on October 25, 2007, by Jive Records. Its production and release occurred as Spears' personal struggles were highly publicized and overshadowed her professional projects. She executive-produced the album, working with producers Danja, Bloodshy & Avant, Sean Garrett, and the Neptunes, among others; it is the only album on which Spears is credited as the executive producer. The final result was primarily a dance-pop and electropop record with R&B, Euro disco and dubstep influences, with lyrical themes revolving around love, fame, media scrutiny, sex, and clubbing.

Blackout was originally slated for November 13, 2007, but was rush-released after leaking online. Initial reviews were polarized: some critics described it as Spears' most progressive and consistent album to date, while others dismissed it due to her controversial public image. The album charted at number one in Canada and Ireland while reaching the top five in Australia, Brazil, France, Greece, Japan, Mexico, Scotland, Switzerland, the United Kingdom, and the United States. Blackout later received platinum certifications from Australia, Canada, Ireland, Poland, Russia, the United Kingdom, and the United States. It won Best Album at the 2008 MTV Europe Music Awards. By the end of 2008, it had sold 3.1 million copies worldwide.

Blackout produced three singles. "Gimme More" peaked at number three on the US Billboard Hot 100, becoming her highest-peaking single on the chart since "...Baby One More Time" (1998), and reached the top ten in an additional 16 countries. "Piece of Me" peaked at number 18 on the Billboard Hot 100, but replicated the international commercial success of its predecessor. Its accompanying music video won Spears her first MTV Video Music Award, winning Video of the Year, Best Female Video and Best Pop Video in 2008. "Break the Ice" did not fare as well as its predecessors, peaking at number 43 on the Billboard Hot 100. Originally intended as the fourth single, "Radar" was later included on Spears' following studio album Circus and was released as its fourth and final single in June 2009.

Unlike her previous albums, Spears did not heavily promote Blackout; her only televised appearance for the album was a universally panned performance of "Gimme More" at the 2007 MTV Video Music Awards. However, a number of its songs were performed on her subsequent tour the Circus Starring Britney Spears (2009) and later on her concert residency Britney: Piece of Me (2013–2017). In retrospect, the album has been deemed a career highlight for Spears and has been praised for its massive impact on the ensuing decade of pop music, being credited for bringing the electropop, avant-disco, EDM, and dubstep sounds to mainstream prominence. Blackout has been listed among the best albums of all time by numerous publications.

== Background and development ==
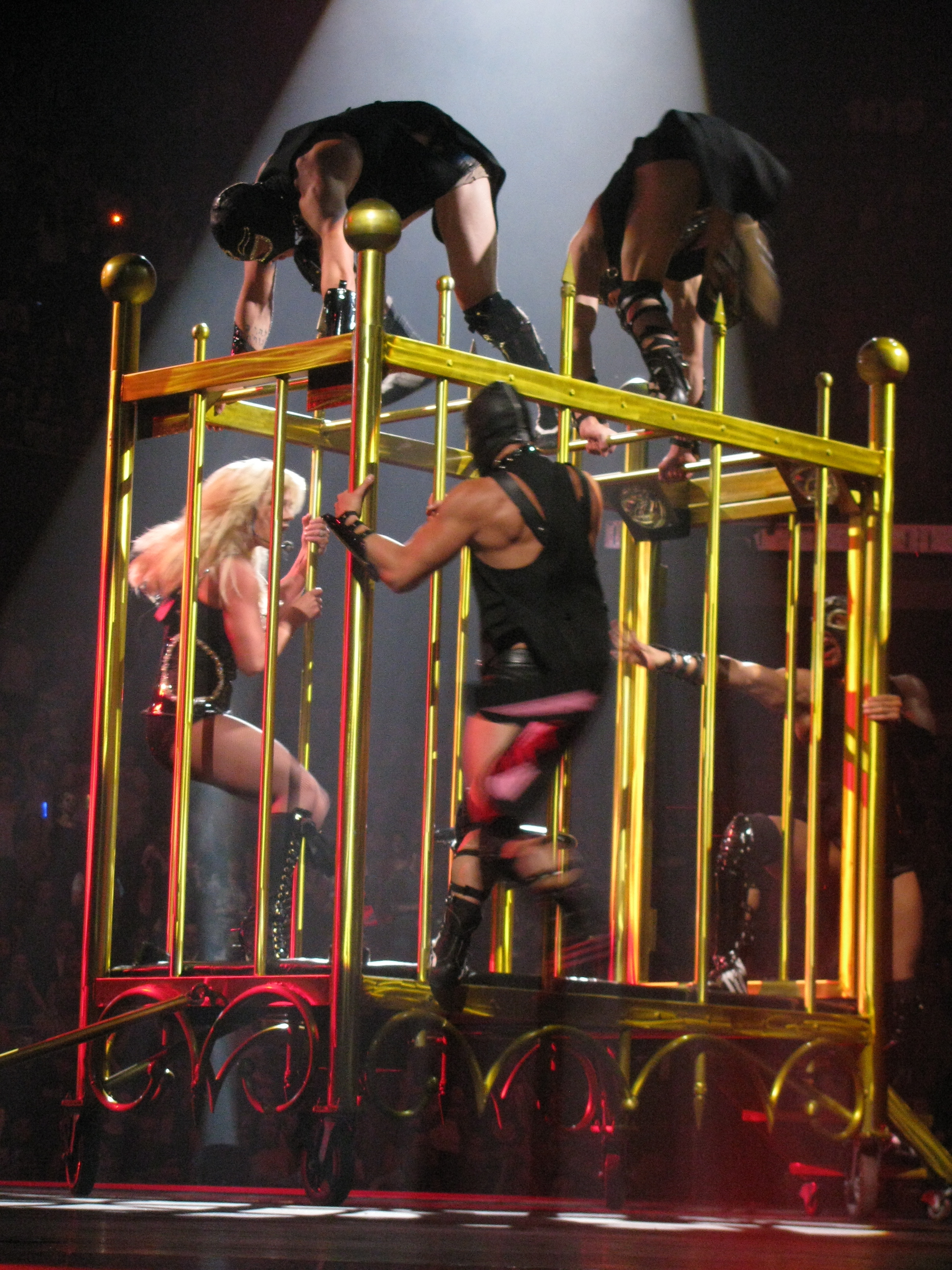
Spears performing "Piece of Me" during the Circus Starring Britney Spears on May 2, 2009

In November 2003, while promoting her fourth studio album In the Zone, Spears told Entertainment Weekly that she was already writing songs for her fifth studio album and was also hoping to start her own record label in 2004. Henrik Jonback later confirmed that he had written songs with her during the European leg of the Onyx Hotel Tour (2004), "in the bus and in her hotel room between the concerts." Following her marriage with Kevin Federline in October 2004, Spears announced through a letter on her official website that she was going to "take some time off to enjoy life." However, on December 30, she made a surprise appearance at the Los Angeles radio station KIIS-FM to premiere a rough mix of a new midtempo track "Mona Lisa". Spears had recorded the song live with her band while on tour, and dedicated it to all the "legends and icons out there". The lyrics lament the fall of Mona Lisa, calling her "unforgettable" and "unpredictable", and cautions listeners not to have a "breakdown". She also revealed she wanted the song to be the lead single from her upcoming album, tentatively titled The Original Doll, and hoped to release it "probably before summertime [2005], or maybe a little sooner than that." In January, Spears posted another letter on her website, saying:

I think I should rephrase myself from my previous letters when I was talking about taking a 'break'. What I meant was I am taking a break from being told what to do. ... It's cool when you look at someone and don't know whether they are at work or play since it's all the same to them. The things I've been doing for work lately have been so much fun, because it's not like work to me anymore. I've been even more 'hands on' in my management and the business side of things, and I feel more in control than ever.

A representative for Jive Records stated that although Spears was working in the studio, "no album is scheduled at the moment" and "there are no plans to service 'Mona Lisa' to radio." "Mona Lisa" was released on the bonus CD included with the DVD of Britney and Kevin: Chaotic (2005), in a re-recorded version with altered lyrics. Spears gave birth to her first son Sean Preston on September 14. In an interview with People in February 2006, Spears explained that she was anxious to resume her career, commenting she missed "traveling [...] the road, seeing different places and being with the dancers and having fun. That feeling of being on the stage, knowing it's your best – I love that. I needed a break. I needed to be hungry again." When asked about her next album, she said she had been experimenting in her home studio with live musicians, stripping down her sound and playing the piano. Spears wanted the album to represent her Louisiana roots, explaining that she grew up listening to blues. "When I was little, I would listen to myself [...] But the record label signs you, and you're just thankful to get a hit song. You can't really show off your voice and where you came from. I would like to try to have more influences of that sound. Not that I'm going to be like frickin' Tina Turner. But you never know", she stated. She also said that she hoped the album would reinvigorate the current pop scene, adding that "It's been boring. Nothing's been wow to me."

On May 9, Spears announced she was pregnant with her second child. A few days later, producers such as J. R. Rotem and Sean Garrett told MTV News they were working with Spears. On September 12, Spears gave birth to her second son Jayden James. She filed for divorce from Federline on November 7, citing irreconcilable differences; the divorce was finalized in July 2007, when the two reached a global settlement and agreed to share joint custody of their sons. During the divorce, her partying and public behavior drew attention from the worldwide media. Spears' maternal aunt Sandra Bridges Covington, with whom she had been very close, died of ovarian cancer in January. In February, Spears suffered from a nervous breakdown and shaved her head, which caused intense media scrutiny. Consequently, she ended with two separate stints at Promises Treatment Centers in Malibu, California. Her manager Larry Rudolph released a statement on March 20, saying that she "successfully complet[ed] their program." In May, she produced a series of promotional concerts at House of Blues venues across the United States, titled The M+M's Tour.

== Recording and production ==
"It's definitely Britney, but the next level. With songs like 'Toxic', she was very innovative, and we're trying to top it. Push it to the next thing. The album wouldn't come out in a while anyhow, since it's at the very beginning. When it comes time to promote the album, she'll be in a different headspace where that's going to be the main thing. But right now, she's happy juggling music and motherhood."

— J. R. Rotem talks about working with Spears in May 2006.

Spears was the executive producer of Blackout, and the album remains her sole album to be executive produced by her. Earnest recording of the album began in 2006, according to a Spears representative. Spears first met J.R. Rotem in Las Vegas in March, and enlisted him to work on the album after listening to Rihanna's "SOS". They wrote and recorded four songs together, including "Everybody", which was originally offered to Rihanna and the Cheetah Girls. In July, she started working with Danja, who contacted songwriters such as Keri Hilson, Jim Beanz and Corté Ellis to work with him. The team wrote seven tracks for Spears – "Gimme More", "Break the Ice", "Get Naked (I Got a Plan)", "Hot as Ice", "Perfect Lover", "Outta This World" and "Get Back". Danja explained that the creative process was not difficult at first since he was "left to do pretty much whatever I wanted to", and "if she felt it, she was gonna ride with it. If she didn't, you'd see it in her face." Hilson wrote "Gimme More" with Spears in mind after Danja played her the instrumental, saying: "I just started singing, 'Give me, Give me' and added a little more in and just having fun and messing around really." Spears began recording with them at the Studio at the Palms in Las Vegas in August, while she was eight months pregnant with Jayden James. Recording continued at Spears' house in Los Angeles, three weeks after she gave birth. Hilson commented that "She gave 150 percent. [...] I don't know any other mother that would do that." Danja added that despite all the problems in her personal life, "As far as her work ethic, I haven't seen anybody come in like that and do what you go to do." Regarding the sound of the album, he deemed it as bigger, more mature and "a new Britney", explaining: "I come from hip-hop, so it's underlined with [it], but I throw it down."

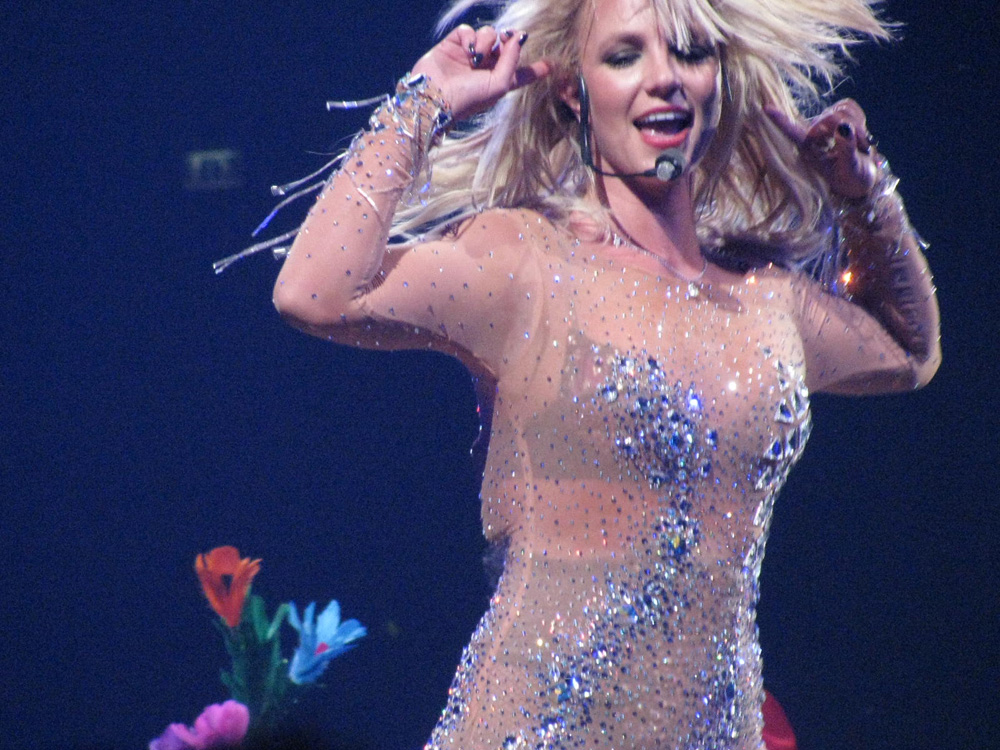
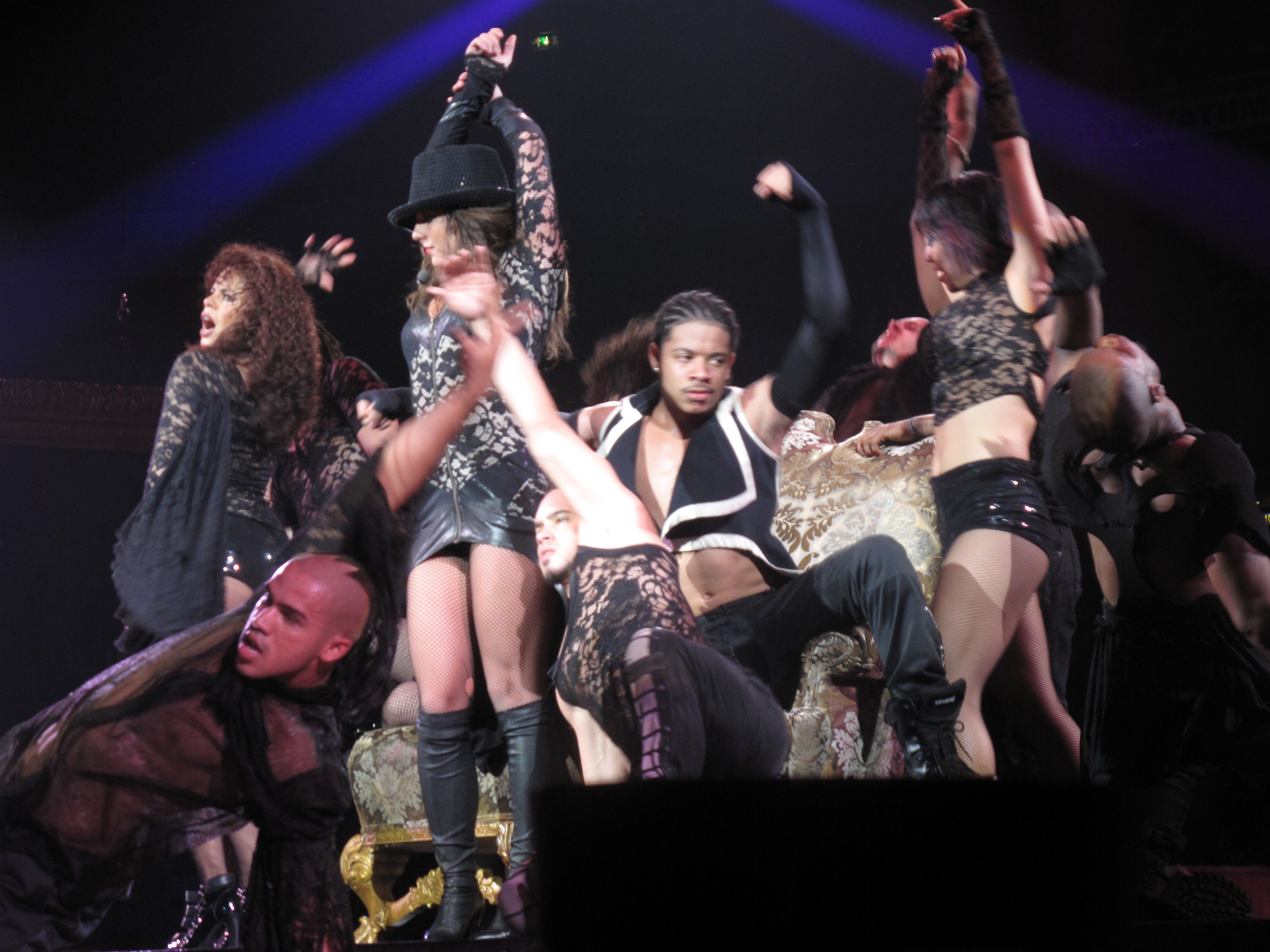
Spears performing "Ooh Ooh Baby" (left) and "Get Naked (I Got a Plan)" (right) during the Circus Starring Britney Spears in 2009

Kara DioGuardi, who also worked on "Heaven on Earth", co-produced and co-wrote "Ooh Ooh Baby" with a pregnant Spears. DioGuardi said that Spears "worked really hard" and called her "unstoppable". In September, Rotem told MTV News that he and Spears were trying to innovate the current sound of radio at the time, exemplifying Nelly Furtado's "Promiscuous". On November 8, the day after she filed for divorce from Federline, Spears recorded "Radar" with Ezekiel Lewis and Patrick M. Smith of the Clutch at the Sony Music Studios in New York City. Lewis had wanted to work with her for a long time and was motivated to produce something for her that was going to "help her project become a great project to come back with". Smith stated that the team tried to create a record "for the Britney Spears that we know and love" and that it did not "touch on anything that was really dealing with all the stuff that she was dealing with." Both commented that although Spears arrived late to the recording sessions, she caught them off guard with her efficiency and professionalism, with Lewis adding: "It was absolutely nuts, and she took directions very well. [...] I don't know what I was expecting because we went in to cut that record the day after she filed divorce from Kevin [Federline]."

"Heaven on Earth" was written by Nicole Morier, Nick Huntington and Michael McGroarty, the latter two known as Freescha. Although Morier had been writing songs with Greg Kurstin and other artists, she felt she "hadn't really found [her] niche" until she wrote "Heaven on Earth", which she described as "a very honest song". After she played the song to her publisher, they met with Spears and her A&R executive Teresa LaBarbera Whites who also worked with Beyonce, both loved it. Morier described "Heaven on Earth" as the song that transformed her career. T-Pain, who co-wrote "Hot as Ice", was in the studio with Spears in February 2007, and stated that one of the three songs they recorded was finished in only an hour. He said that he "thought she was going to be sitting on the couch eating Doritos or nachos or something [...] but she came in, shook my hand, gave me a hug and went right in the booth. She got in there and put it down." Christian Karlsson and Pontus Winnberg, known as Bloodshy & Avant, co-wrote and co-produced "Radar", "Freakshow" and "Toy Soldier" in late 2006. When the album was considered to be finished, they were persuaded by LaBarbera Whites to work on a new track. Winnberg commented that it had always been "an unwritten rule" to not write songs about Spears' personal life, since "Sweet Dreams My LA Ex", an answer song to Justin Timberlake's "Cry Me a River", was rejected by Jive Records. However, the duo wrote "Piece of Me" with Klas Åhlund anyway, as an answer to Spears' critics, and sent it to Spears, who "loved it". Winnberg stated: "We knew that the song broke all the rules we had, [...] When she came to the studio, she was extremely psyched, had learned the lyrics by heart in the car, and recorded the song on half an hour." Before the album's release, LaBarbera Whites told MTV News that the album "shows a lot of growth as a performer. [...] She was very involved in the songs and how they turned out. It's her magic that turns these songs into what they are." Among the producers who worked on Blackout but didn't make the album were Scott Storch, Dr. Luke and Ne-Yo.

== Music and lyrics ==
"Circus is a little bit lighter than Blackout. I think a lot of the songs I did at that time, I was going through a really dark phase in my life, so a lot of the songs reflect that. [...] But they're two totally different vibes. Blackout is a little bit more darker and edgier, and a little bit more urban."

— Spears comparing Blackout with Circus.

Danja stated that Spears' objective was to make Blackout a fun, danceable album with uptempo, high-energy music, saying: "She wanted to stay away from being personal. It's fun, it's basic and there's nothing wrong with that. It's about feeling good, celebrating womanhood." The result was a primarily dance-pop, electropop, techno and avant-disco album with R&B elements. The album opens with the lead single "Gimme More", a dance-pop and electropop song. The song opens with a spoken intro in which Spears says the line "It's Britney, bitch". While the lyrics appear to be about dance and sex, they are actually about the media's fascination with her private life, as noted in the lines "Cameras are flashin' while we're dirty dancin' / They keep watchin', keep watchin'". The next track and second single "Piece of Me" runs through a down-tempo dance beat and consists of over-the-top vocal distortions, causing a split sound effect and making it difficult to discern which voice is Spears'. It talks about fame and is written as a biography retelling her mishaps, while she sings in a nearly spoken manner. The third track "Radar" is an electropop and Eurodisco song which features distorted synthesizers emulating sonar pulses, that received comparisons to those of Soft Cell's "Tainted Love" (1981). In its lyrics, Spears lets the subject know he is on her radar, while she lists the qualities the man has.

"Freakshow"
A sample of the bridge of "Freakshow". The track is built around the "wobbler" effect of dubstep, and her vocals are pitched down low, making her sound masculine.

The fourth track and third single "Break the Ice" opens with Spears singing the lines "It's been a while / I know I shouldn't have kept you waiting / But I'm here now". The song features a choir, with Keri Hilson providing backing vocals, causing the song to sound almost like a duet. Hilson explained the song is about "two people, a girl and a guy, [...] and the girl is saying, 'You're a little cold. Let me warm things up and break the ice.'" After the chorus, the bridge begins with Spears saying "I like this part", mimicking Janet Jackson on "Nasty" (1986). The album's fifth track "Heaven on Earth" is a Eurodisco love song with new wave influences. It was inspired by Donna Summer's "I Feel Love" (1977), with three vocal lines taking place over the beat. Nicole Morier commented that the song was written from a very dark place, saying: "I was thinking of someone and thinking they were so perfect and that I have all these imperfections. [...] I think what's touching about it is that it's from the perspective of someone who feels like they really need this person just to feel safe and feel good." At the time of its release, Spears named the song her favorite from Blackout. "Get Naked (I Got a Plan)" is an uptempo track about sex. It is a duet between Spears and Danja, who sings the chorus with his voice distorted to sound like a decaying moan. Spears contributes a series of gasps, sighs and chants and her voice is also distorted. "Freakshow" is built around the "wobbler" effect of dubstep. Spears sings about dancing and being in the spotlight in lyrics such as "Make them other chicks so mad / I'm 'bout to shake my ass / Snatch that boy so fast". During the bridge, her vocals are pitched down low, making her sound masculine. Nearly a decade after the release of Blackout, Spears stated "Freakshow" was one of her favorite non-single tracks, describing it as "sassy".

The eighth track "Toy Soldier" is an upbeat dance-pop song reminiscent of Destiny's Child's song "Lose My Breath" (2004), showcasing a military drumroll and features Spears singing about needing a new lover. On "Hot as Ice", she sings in a higher register: "I'm just a girl with the ability to drive a man crazy / Make him call me 'mama', make him my new baby." "Ooh Ooh Baby" contains a flamenco guitar and blends the beat from Gary Glitter's "Rock and Roll" (1972) and the melody of the Turtles' "Happy Together" (1967). In its lyrics, she sings to a lover: "Touch me and I come alive / I can feel you on my lips / I can feel you deep inside". Kara DioGuardi said she was inspired by the relationship between Spears and her first son in the studio, saying: "I would look at the two of them, the way they looked at each other and the way she would hold the baby. It kind of struck me as interesting. At times it'd be about a kid at times about a lover." "Perfect Lover" has a propulsive, clattery belly-dance beat, against which Spears sings lyrics such as "Tick-tock / Tick-tock / Come and get me while I'm hot". Standard edition of Blackout closes with "Why Should I Be Sad", a midtempo song directed to her ex-husband Kevin Federline. "Everybody" samples Eurythmics' "Sweet Dreams (Are Made of This)" (1983) and features Spears singing about the dancefloor in a breathy lower register. "Get Back" is an uptempo dance track with a dark musical tone described as "spooky-sassy".

== Title and packaging ==
In June 2007, Spears posted a message on her official website asking for assistance with a title for her fifth studio album. Among the options were OMG Is Like Lindsay Lohan Like Okay Like, What If the Joke Is on You, Down Boy, Integrity and Dignity. On October 6, Jive Records announced through a press release that the album would be titled Blackout, referring to "blocking out negativity and embracing life fully." Its album cover and booklet images were photographed by Ellen von Unwerth. Jive revealed the cover alongside the album's track listing on October 12. It features Spears sporting black hair and wearing a pink dress, and a white fedora; the rear cover of the physical CD pressings shows the dress in blue. The cover received negative critical response. The album's booklet contains photographs of empty chairs with ripped tabloid pages and still images from the music video for "Gimme More". It does not include a thank-you list, unlike her previous albums' booklets.

The centerfold photographs for Blackout feature Spears and a priest posing suggestively inside a confessional. The first image shows Spears, who wears a cross and fishnet stockings, sitting on the priest's lap, while in the second one she leans suggestively against the confessional with the priest sitting on the other side of the partition. After the album was released, the Catholic League's director of communications Kiera McCaffrey stated that the group considered the photos a "cheap publicity stunt" to promote the album and condemned Spears for "mocking a Catholic sacrament". McCaffrey added: "All we see is how troubled this girl is now, especially with her family, losing her kids, with her career on a downward slide. And now she's put out this album and this is her tactic to promote it?" Gil Kaufman of MTV said that the images were reminiscent of Madonna's music video for "Like a Prayer" (1989).

== Release and promotion ==
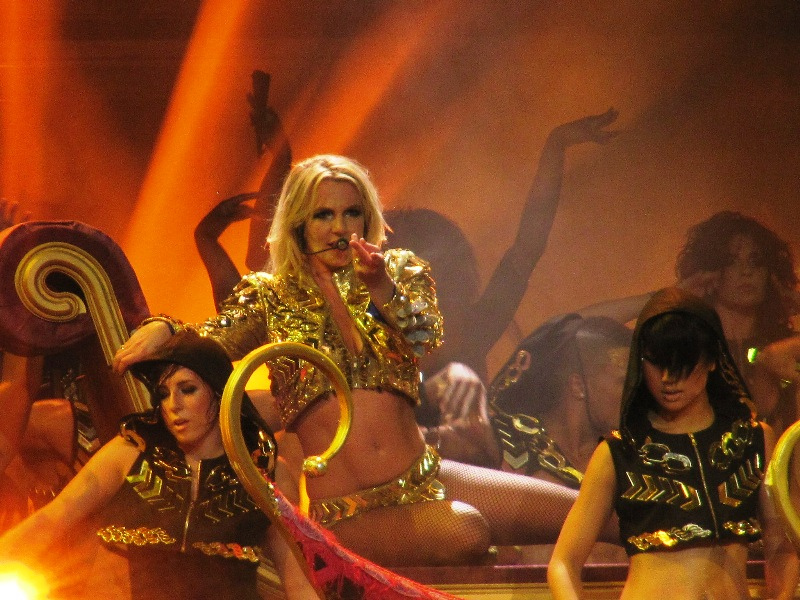
Spears performing "Gimme More" during the Femme Fatale Tour in 2011

After days of media speculation, it was confirmed on September 6, 2007, that Spears would open the 2007 MTV Video Music Awards at the Palms Hotel and Casino's Pearl Theatre in Las Vegas on September 9. It was also announced that she was going to perform "Gimme More", with a magic act from illusionist Criss Angel in some parts of the performance. However, the bit is thought to have been rejected by the show's organizers at the last minute. The performance began with Spears singing the first lines of Elvis Presley's 1958 song "Trouble". "Gimme More" began, and the camera panned out to reveal Spears wearing a black, jewel-encrusted bikini and black boots. She was accompanied by male and female dancers dressed in black outfits. Several pole dancers danced in smaller stages around the audience. The performance was universally panned by critics. Jeff Leeds of The New York Times said that "no one was prepared for Sunday night's fiasco, in which a listless Ms. Spears teetered through her dance steps and mouthed only occasional words in a wan attempt to lip-synch her new single". Vinay Menon of the Toronto Star commented Spears "looked hopelessly dazed. She was wearing the expression of somebody who had been deposited at the Palms Casino Resort by a tornado, one that promptly twisted away, taking her clothing and sense of purpose. [...] [She was] lumbering, in slow motion, as if somebody had poured cement into her streetwalker boots". David Willis of BBC stated her performance would "go down in the history books as being one of the worst to grace the MTV Awards".

Blackout was set to be released on November 13. However, Jive Records announced on October 10 that the release date would be moved up two weeks, to October 30, due to unauthorized leaks. The following day, Zomba Label Group filed a lawsuit against Perez Hilton, claiming he illegally obtained and posted on his gossip blog at least ten songs and unfinished demos of the album. Zomba representatives alleged the posts had taken place over the course of the previous three months, and requested real and punitive damages as well as legal costs. On June 30, 2009, the parties submitted a stipulation to dismiss the case, pursuant to an undisclosed settlement agreement. The following month, The District Court judge dismissed the case with prejudice. Unlike Spears' previous studio albums, Blackout was not heavily promoted through magazine interviews, talk show appearances or televised performances besides the performance at the 2007 MTV Video Music Awards, and was not accompanied by a tour either. Spears gave her only interview to promote the album to Ryan Seacrest on his radio show on KIIS-FM. During the seven-minute interview, Seacrest focused on asking questions about Spears' personal struggles than on the album itself. On November 27, 2007, MTV launched the contest "Britney Spears Wants a Piece of You", in which fans could direct a separate video for "Piece of Me", using footage of interviews and performances from Spears. Using the MTV Video Remixer, fans could mix and create a mashup of the footage. The winning video premiered on Total Request Live on December 20, and MTV, Jive Records, and Spears herself picked the winner. The winner also received a Haier Ibiza Rhapsody device along with a one-year subscription to Rhapsody, as well as Spears' entire discography released in the United States.

== Singles ==
"Piece of Me"
"Piece of Me" runs through a down-tempo dance beat and consists of over-the-top vocal distortions, causing a split sound effect. It talks about fame and is written like a biography retelling Spears' mishaps, while she sings in a nearly spoken manner.

"Gimme More" was released as the lead single from Blackout on August 31, 2007, to critical acclaim. It peaked at number three on the US Billboard Hot 100, becoming her fifth top-ten entry and also her second highest-peaking single at the time, after her number-one debut single "...Baby One More Time" (1998). It also peaked atop the Canadian Hot 100 and within the top five in Australia, Belgium, Croatia, Denmark, France, Ireland, Italy, Norway, Sweden, Switzerland, Ukraine and the United Kingdom. Its Jake Sarfaty-directed accompanying music video premiered on October 5. It displayed Spears as a stripper and introduced a departure from Spears' previous highly-choreographed music videos. The video received mixed to negative reviews from critics, who panned Spears' pole dancing as well as the lack of storyline.

"Piece of Me" was released as the second single from Blackout on November 27, 2007. Critics gave the song positive reviews, praising its production and defiant lyrics, while citing it as one of the highlights from the album. Rolling Stone ranked the song at number 15 on their list of the 100 best songs of 2007. It peaked at number one in Ireland and within the top ten in Australia, Austria, Canada, the Commonwealth of Independent States, Denmark, Finland, France, Germany, New Zealand, Slovakia, Sweden and the United Kingdom. In the United States, it became Spears' fourth Dance Club Songs number-one single, and peaked at number 18 on the Billboard Hot 100. Its accompanying music video, directed by Wayne Isham, portrayed Spears' life at the time and showed her with her friends disguising themselves in order to confuse the paparazzi. Isham's concept was to have Spears confidently parodying her situation. It received mixed reviews from critics, most of whom argued her body was digitally altered. The video was nominated in three categories at the 2008 MTV Video Music Awards and won all of them–Video of the Year, Best Female Video and Best Pop Video–marking Spears' first MTV Video Music Award wins ever.

"Break the Ice" was released as the third and final single from Blackout on March 3, 2008. It received acclaim from critics, some of whom called it an album highlight. The song reached the top ten in Canada, Finland and Ireland, peaking within the top 40 in most other countries. In the US, the song peaked at number 43 on the Billboard Hot 100, but became Spears' third consecutive Dance Club Songs number-one single. An accompanying music video, directed by Robert Hales, was released on March 12. The anime video was based on the superheroine character of Spears' 2004 music video for "Toxic", and portrays her destroying a highly secured laboratory with several clones, including one of herself.

"Radar" was originally planned to be released as the third single from Blackout, but according to Ezekiel Lewis of the Clutch. "Break the Ice" was chosen instead. However, the full single release was initially cancelled when Spears began recording new material for her sixth studio album Circus (2008). "Radar" was later included on Circus and officially released as the fourth and final single from the album on June 22, 2009, peaking at number 88 on the US Billboard Hot 100.

== Critical reception ==
Professional ratings
Aggregate scores
Source	Rating
Metacritic	61/100
Review scores
Source	Rating
AllMusic	5/5 stars
The A.V. Club	B+
Entertainment Weekly	B+
The Guardian	4/5 stars
MSN Music (Consumer Guide)	B+
NME	4/10
Pitchfork	8.1/10
Rolling Stone	3.5/5 stars
Slant Magazine	3.5/5 stars
Sputnikmusic	4/5

Upon its release, Blackout received mixed to positive reviews from music critics. On music review aggregator Metacritic, the album holds a score of 61 out of 100, indicating "generally favorable reviews", based on 24 reviews. Stephen Thomas Erlewine, senior editor of AllMusic, described the album as "state-of-the-art dance-pop, a testament to skills of the producers and perhaps even Britney being somehow cognizant enough to realize she should hire the best, even if she's not at her best." Dennis Lim of Blender deemed it "her most consistent [album], a seamlessly entertaining collection of bright, brash electropop." Margeaux Watson of Entertainment Weekly commented that while the album was not poetry, "there is something delightfully escapist about Blackout, a perfectly serviceable dance album abundant in the kind of bouncy electro elements that buttressed her hottest hits." A reviewer for NME said that the heavily-processed vocals made Spears sound robotic, adding that "it could really do with a few more human touches." Pitchfork's Tom Ewing called "Get Naked (I Got a Plan)" the centerpiece of Blackout, and branded the album "superb modern pop, which could probably only have been released by this star at this moment. Britney as walking catastrophe makes for great car-crash copy and her record can fit into that if you want it to." Ewing also compared the relationship between Spears and the album with American television series Twin Peaks, saying that what made the show "so great wasn't the central good-girl-gone-bad story, it was the strangeness that story liberated. And Britney's off-disc life is both distraction from and enabler for this extraordinary album".

Mike Schiller of PopMatters was more critical, saying: "Right down to its utterly garish cover, Blackout is utterly disposable and ultimately forgettable." Melissa Maerz from Rolling Stone explained that the album "is the first time in her career that she's voiced any real thoughts about her life" and that "she's gonna crank the best pop booty jams until a social worker cuts off her supply of hits." Slant Magazine writer Sal Cinquemani unfavorably compared the album to In the Zone, saying that although Blackout "scores well, and its hotness quotient is remarkably high, [it] isn't much of a step forward for Britney following 2003's surprisingly strong In the Zone, for which she received a writing credit on a majority of the songs (as opposed to a scant three here)." Andy Battaglia of The A.V. Club said the album "counts both as a significant event and as a disquieting aberration that couldn't be more mysteriously manufactured or bizarrely ill-timed" in which "every song counts as markedly progressive and strange." Alexis Petridis from The Guardian called it "a bold, exciting album: the question is whether anyone will be able to hear its contents over the deafening roar of tittle-tattle." He elaborated that when faced with a public image in freefall, an artist has two options: making music "that harks back to your golden, pre-tailspin days" to "underlin[e] your complete normality" or "to throw caution to the wind: given your waning fortunes, what's the harm in taking a few musical risks?" Petridis commented that Spears opted for the latter and the results were "largely fantastic."

Kelefa Sanneh of The New York Times said: "The electronic beats and bass lines are as thick as Ms. Spears's voice is thin, and as the album title suggests, the general mood is bracingly unapologetic." Sanneh added that Spears had a spectral presence on the album, explaining that when compared to her previous records, "[she] cuts a startlingly low profile on Blackout [...] Even when she was being marketed as a clean-cut ex-Mouseketeer, and even when she was touring the country with a microphone that functioned largely as a prop, something about her was intense." Peter Robinson of The Observer stated that Spears "delivered the best album of her career, raising the bar for modern pop music with an incendiary mix of Timbaland's Shock Value and her own back catalogue." The Phoenix's Ellee Dean said the album "may be more a tribute to the skills of the A-list producers who guided her through the disc than to any of her own talents. But at least she was smart enough to accept that guidance." In his consumer guide for MSN Music, critic Robert Christgau gave the album a B+ and said that "From 'Gimme More''s 'It's Britney bitch' hiya to 'Piece of Me''s single-of-the-year sonics, from 'Ooh Ooh Baby''s 'feel you deep inside' to 'Perfect Lover''s 'touch me there', this album is pure, juicy, plastic get-naked."

Retrospective critical reviews, however, have praised Blackout and noted its strong influence on the music of the late 2000s and early 2010s. Rob Sheffield of Rolling Stone described it as "one of the most influential albums in modern pop". In a retrospective review published in 2017, Alim Kheraj of Dazed called the album "one of the most inventive pop records in recent history", the record that "forevermore proved that [Spears'] career was way more than just an 'inept pantomime'[.]" Kheraj also said that the album "was the result of a hazardous moment in pop culture history that saw a serendipitous and symbiotic relationship between an artist eroding her past and producers forging their future that payed [sic] off." In 2017 publications such as Billboard, The Fader, Nylon and Vice regarded Blackout as Spears' best effort to date. In 2022, Elise Soutar of PopMatters noted the album "feels fresher than ever 15 years on".

== Accolades ==
=== Awards and nominations ===
Awards and nominations
Year	Organization	Award	Result	Ref.
2008	Alfa Music Awards	Best Album	Won	
2008	NME Awards	Worst Album	Won	
2008	NRJ Music Award	International Album of the Year	Won	
2008	MTV Europe Music Award	Best Album	Won	
2008	Virgin Media Music Awards	Disaster of the Year	Nominated	
2008	Virgin Media Music Awards	Best Album	Won	

=== Listings ===
Listings
Year	Publication	Listicle	Position	Ref.
2007	Billboard	Readers' Choice – Top Ten Albums of 2007	1st	
2007	Idolator	Critics' Best Albums of 2007	33rd	
2007	The Guardian	2007's Best Albums	17th	
2007	The Observer	2007: The Best 50 Albums	50th	
2007	Rolling Stone	Top 50 Albums of 2007	50th	
2007	Slant Magazine	Top Albums of 2007	Placed	
2009	Rock's Backpages	Best Albums, 2000–2009	5th	
2009	Rolling Stone	The Decade-End Readers' Poll	7th	
2009	The Times	Best Pop Albums of the Decade	5th	
2013	The Guardian	Writers' 500 Favorite Albums Ever	Placed	
2019	The Guardian	The 100 Best Albums of the 21st Century	39th	
2020	Rolling Stone	The 500 Greatest Albums of All Time	441st	

== Commercial performance ==
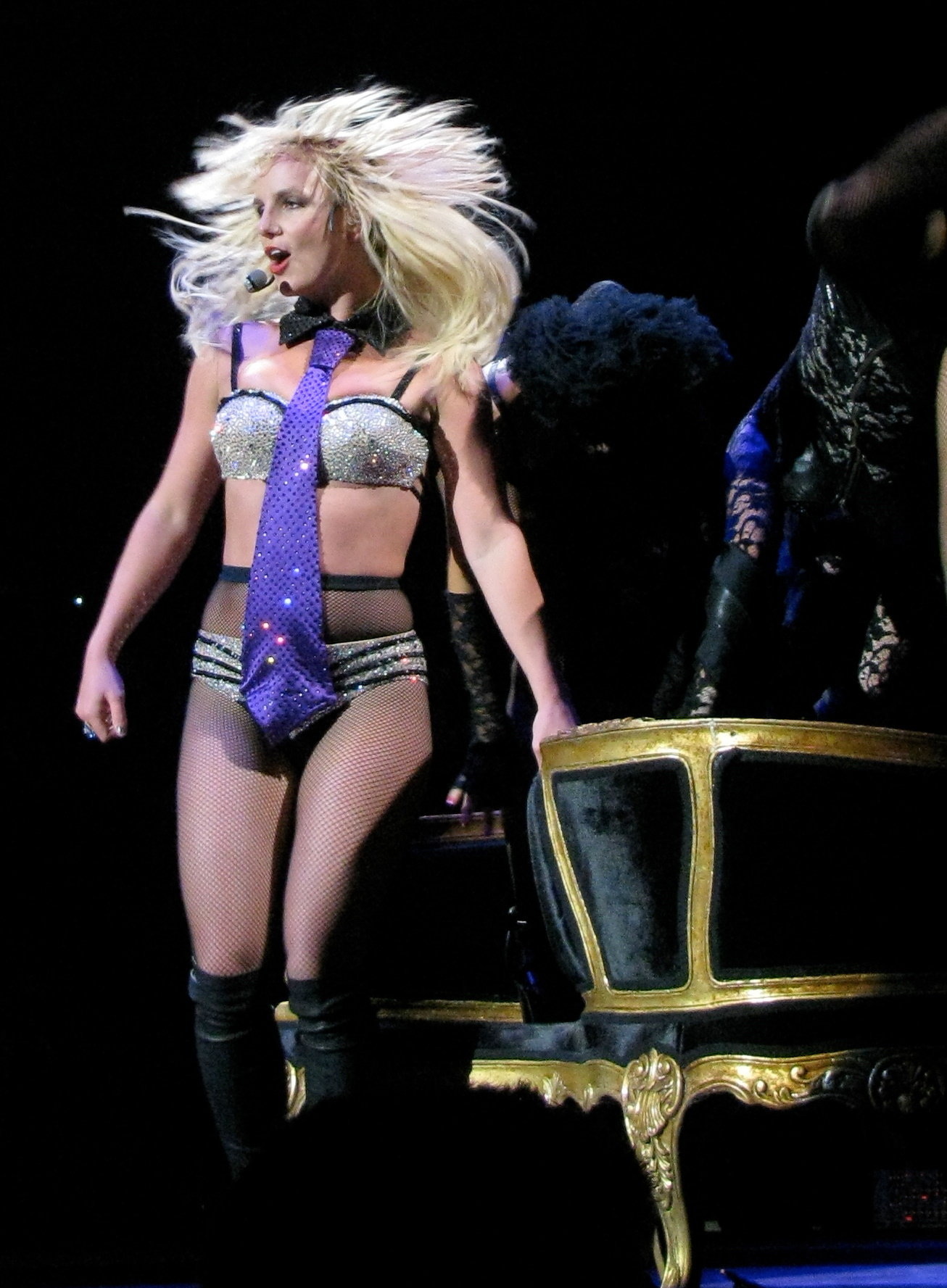
Spears performing "Freakshow" during the Circus Starring Britney Spears in 2009

In the United States, Blackout sold 124,000 copies during its first day of availability according to Nielsen SoundScan. Jessica Letkemann of Billboard compared the sales favorably to those of the previous week's number-one album Carnival Ride by Carrie Underwood, which sold 49,000 copies, estimating that Blackout would possibly debut atop the Billboard 200. On November 6, 2007, Billboard announced that even though the Eagles's first-week sales of Long Road Out of Eden had handily surpassed Spears, they would not debut atop the chart because of rules forbidding albums exclusively sold at one retail outlet–Walmart in this case–from entering the Billboard 200. During the afternoon of the same day, Walmart issued a press release announcing that Long Road Out of Eden had sold 711,000 copies. At night, it was announced through an article on Billboard.biz that after an agreement with Nielsen SoundScan, Billboard would allow exclusive albums only available through one retailer to appear on the charts, effective that same week. Hence, Long Road Out of Eden topped the Billboard 200, while Blackout debuted at number two, with first-week sales of 290,000 copies. It became Spears' first studio album not to debut at number one. The album, however, set the record for the highest first-week digital sales for a female artist at the time. Following the release of Circus in December 2008, Blackout re-entered the chart at number 198, with sales of 4,600 copies; it has spent a total of 34 weeks on the chart. As of March 2015, the album has sold one million copies in the country, and was certified double platinum by the Recording Industry Association of America (RIAA) in October 2023.

In Canada, Blackout debuted atop the Canadian Albums Chart with sales of 29,000 units, becoming her first number-one album there since Britney (2001). It was certified platinum by the Canadian Recording Industry Association (CRIA) for shipments of 100,000 copies. In Mexico, the album debuted at number 18, peaking at number two in its third week. In Australia and New Zealand, the album debuted at numbers three and eight, respectively. It was certified platinum by the Australian Recording Industry Association (ARIA) and gold by the Recording Industry Association of New Zealand (RIANZ). In Japan, the album peaked at number four on the Oricon Albums Chart, being certified gold by the Recording Industry Association of Japan (RIAJ). In the United Kingdom, Blackout debuted at number two on the UK Albums Chart with sales of 42,000 units, behind Long Road Out of Eden, and stayed on the chart for 28 weeks. It was certified platinum by the British Phonographic Industry (BPI) for shipments of 300,000 copies. The album debuted at the summit in Ireland and on the European Top 100 Albums. Across Europe, it reached the top ten in Austria, Belgium, Denmark, France, Germany, Greece, Italy, Portugal and Switzerland. According to the International Federation of the Phonographic Industry (IFPI), the album was the world's 32nd best-selling album of 2007. By the end of 2008, Blackout had sold 3.1 million copies worldwide.

== Legacy ==
A punk masterpiece, [Blackout] is an avant-disco concept album about getting famous, not giving a fuck, getting divorced, not giving a fuck, getting publicly mocked and despised and humiliated. It's an album about dancing on tables in a cloud of glitter and Cheeto dust. But mostly it's an album about not giving a fuck, which is why it sounds perfect for grim times like these. Especially since America in 2017 is less sane or stable than Britney was in 2007. If our girl could emerge from the wreckage with an album like Blackout, there's hope for us all

— Rob Sheffield of Rolling Stone

When Blackout was released, Spears' behavior in public began to clash with her image. Stephen Thomas Erlewine of AllMusic stated that Spears was an artist that always relied on her "carefully sculpted sexpot-next-door persona", but for Blackout "those images [we]re replaced by images of Britney beating cars up with umbrellas, wiping her greasy fingers on designer dresses, and nodding off on-stage, each new disaster stripping away any residual sexiness in her public image." Erlewine added that the album served as a soundtrack "for Britney's hazy, drunken days, reflecting the excess that's splashed all over the tabloids", while noting that the album had a coherence that the public Spears lacked. "When she dropped Blackout in 2007, the music industry scoffed, but then proceeded to spend the next few years imitating it to death, to the point where everything on pop radio sounded like Blackout," said Rob Sheffield of Rolling Stone.

Blackout has been referred by MTV News as a "pop bible" for its impact on the music industry, and is considered one of the most influential pop albums of the 2000s. English singer and songwriter Sam Smith wrote on their Instagram page, "One of the greatest fucking albums of all time. No arguments". Tom Ewing of Pitchfork noted that after "Freakshow" leaked online, a dubstep forum thread on the song hit seven pages in twenty-four hours, generating mixed reactions and exemplifying that "it still seems [that] when the mainstream borrows underground music, [it] brings it into the wider pop vocabulary." He also attributed the quality of every track of Blackout to economic reasons, since one of the main causes album sales began to suffer during the digital era is due to the "unbundling" of albums in online stores – making it easier for consumers to buy some tracks rather than the entire album. Ewing explained that "The Revolver blueprint for pop albums – every track good, every track a potential hit – makes more sense than ever. Especially if a star can keep sonically up-to-date in a fast-moving market."

Reviewers noted the use of Auto-Tune in Spears' voice. Ewing said that Blackout serves as a reminder of how instantly recognizable Spears' vocals are, saying that "treated or untreated: her thin Southern huskiness is one of the defining sounds of 00s pop." He noted that the album "is a masterclass in autotune and vocal treatment as a studio instrument, disrupting and jamming the songs as much as it helps them." While reviewing Spears' demo of "Telephone", Rob Sheffield of Rolling Stone compared it to "Piece of Me", "proving yet again how much impact Britney has had on the sonics of current pop. People love to make fun of Britney, and why not, but if 'Telephone' proves anything, it's that Blackout may be the most influential pop album of the past five years." In June 2012, Blackout was added to the Rock and Roll Hall of Fame's musical library and archive. Calling it a "mutant pop classic", Dazed named Blackout as one of the most influential albums of the last decade for the way it suffused hip hop, pop, R&B and EDM, and further said "Spears once lamented that she wasn't a girl but not yet a woman... Blackout was the signal that this transition had reached its climax. Yet rather than emerging as a Stepford pop princess, the Britney that appeared was disruptive and peddling demented pop music." The Independent ranked Blackout number three on their list of the 20 most underrated albums ever, with Roisin O'Connor crediting the "icy beats and glitchy synths" of "Piece of Me" for inspiring "generations of future-leaning pop stars in the decades to come." Rolling Stone ranked the album number 80 on its 2025 list of the "250 Greatest Albums of the 21st Century So Far". The magazine's Rob Sheffield wrote that although "everyone expected Blackout to be the end of the road for Britney Spears... [the album] turned out to be not just her best and Britney-est moment, but one of the era's most influential pop albums, with an aggressive robo-disco edge."

== Track listing ==
Blackout
No.	Title	Writer(s)	Producer(s)	Length
1.	"Gimme More"	Nate Hills; James Washington; Keri Hilson; Marcella Araica	Danja; Jim Beanz^{[a]}; Hilson^{[a]}	4:11
2.	"Piece of Me"	Christian Karlsson; Pontus Winnberg; Klas Åhlund	Bloodshy & Avant	3:32
3.	"Radar"	Karlsson; Winnberg; Henrik Jonback; Balewa Muhammad; Candice Nelson; Ezekiel Lewis; J. Que	Bloodshy & Avant; The Clutch^{[b]}	3:49
4.	"Break the Ice"	Hills; Washington; Hilson; Araica	Danja; Beanz^{[a]}	3:16
5.	"Heaven on Earth"	Michael McGroarty; Nick Huntington; Nicole Morier	Freescha; Kara DioGuardi	4:52
6.	"Get Naked (I Got a Plan)"	Corté Ellis; Washington; Hills; Araica; Nigel Talley	Danja; Beanz^{[a]}	4:45
7.	"Freakshow"	Britney Spears; Karlsson; Winnberg; Jonback; Lewis; J. Que	Bloodshy & Avant; The Clutch^{[b]}	2:55
8.	"Toy Soldier"	Karlsson; Winnberg; Magnus Wallbert; Sean "The Pen" Garrett	Bloodshy & Avant; Garrett^{[b]}	3:21
9.	"Hot as Ice"	Faheem "T-Pain" Najm; Hills; Araica	Danja; Beanz^{[a]}	3:16
10.	"Ooh Ooh Baby"	Spears; DioGuardi; Farid "Fredwreck" Nassar; Erick Coomes	Nassar; DioGuardi	3:28
11.	"Perfect Lover"	Hills; Washington; Hilson; Araica	Danja; Beanz^{[a]}	3:02
12.	"Why Should I Be Sad"	Pharrell Williams	The Neptunes	3:10
Total length:				43:37

Japanese edition
No.	Title	Writer(s)	Producer(s)	Length
13.	"Outta This World"	Hills; Washington; Hilson; Araica	Danja; Beanz^{[a]}	3:45
14.	"Everybody"	J. R. Rotem; Evan Kidd Bogart; Annie Lennox; Dave Stewart	J. R. Rotem	3:17
15.	"Get Back"	Ellis; Hills; Araica	Danja; Ellis^{[a]}	3:50
16.	"Gimme More" (Oakenfold Remix)	Hills; Washington; Hilson; Araica	Danja; Beanz^{[a]}; Paul Oakenfold^{[c]}; Ian Green^{[c]}	3:40
Total length:				58:09

=== Notes ===
- ^{^[a]} signifies a vocal producer
- ^{^[b]} signifies a co-producer
- ^{^[c]} signifies an additional producer
- Track 13 originally appeared on the US Target-exclusive edition.
- Digital deluxe edition includes tracks 14 and 15, alongside the Junkie XL dub of "Gimme More". On the iTunes Store and Apple Music, the music video for "Gimme More" is additionally included.

Sample credits

- "Ooh Ooh Baby" contains uncredited samples from "Rock and Roll" by Gary Glitter and "Happy Together" by the Turtles.
- "Everybody" contains a sample from "Sweet Dreams (Are Made of This)" by the Eurythmics.

== Personnel ==
Credits are adapted from the liner notes of Blackout.

- Klas Åhlund – bass (track 2), songwriting (track 2)
- Marcella "Ms. Lago" Araica – engineering (tracks 1, 4, 6, 9 and 11), mixing (tracks 1, 4, 6, 9 and 11), programming (tracks 1, 4 and 6), songwriting (tracks 1, 4, 6, 9 and 11)
- Jim Beanz – backing vocals (tracks 1, 4, 9 and 11), songwriting (tracks 1, 4 and 11), vocal production (tracks 1, 4, 6, 9 and 11)
- Bloodshy & Avant – bass (tracks 2, 3, 7 and 8), engineering (tracks 2, 3, 7 and 8), guitar (tracks 2, 3, 7 and 8), keyboards (tracks 2, 3, 7 and 8), production (tracks 2, 3, 7 and 8), programming (track 2, 3, 7 and 8), songwriting (tracks 2, 3, 7 and 8)
- Kobie "The Quarterback" Brown – clearance
- Miguel Bustamante – mixing assistance (track 9)
- Jim Carauna – engineering (tracks 3 and 7)
- Robyn Carlsson – backing vocals (track 2)
- The Clutch – engineering (tracks 3 and 7), production (tracks 3 and 7)
- Erick Coomes – bass (track 10), guitar (track 10), songwriting (track 10)
- Tom Coyne – mastering (all tracks)
- Danja – production (tracks 1, 4, 6, 9 and 11), songwriting (tracks 1, 4, 6, 9 and 11)
- Kara DioGuardi – backing vocals (track 10), production (tracks 5 and 10), songwriting (track 10), vocal production (track 5)
- Corté "The Author" Ellis – backing vocals (track 6), songwriting (track 6)
- Damon Ellis – clearance
- David M. Erlich – production coordination (tracks 1, 4, 6, 9 and 11)
- Devine Evans – digital effects (track 6), Pro Tools editing (track 6)
- Mike Evans – production coordination (tracks 1, 4, 6, 9 and 11)
- Niklas Flyckt – mixing (tracks 2, 3, 7 and 8)
- Freescha – engineering (track 5), instrumentation (track 5), production (track 5), songwriting (track 5)
- Sean "The Pen" Garrett – backing vocals (track 8), production (track 8), songwriting (track 8)
- Brian Garten – engineering (track 12)
- Hart Gunther – engineering assistance (track 12)
- Mark Gray – engineering assistance (track 4)
- Jeri Heiden – art direction, design
- Keri Hilson – backing vocals (tracks 1, 4 and 11), songwriting (tracks 1, 4 and 11), vocal production (track 1)
- Mike Houge – engineering (track 10), mixing assistance (track 10)
- Chad Hugo – mixing (track 12), production (track 12)
- Richard "Segal" Huredia – engineering (track 10)
- Cara Hutchinson – Zomba production coordination
- Lisa Jachno – manicure
- Henrik Jonback – bass (track 7), guitar (tracks 2, 3 and 7), songwriting (tracks 2, 3 and 7)
- Ryan Kennedy – engineering assistance (track 12)
- Ezekiel Lewis – backing vocals (track 7), songwriting (tracks 3 and 7)
- Tony Maserati – mixing (tracks 5 and 10)
- Miike Snow – engineering assistance (tracks 9 and 11), mixing assistance (tracks 1, 4, 6, 9 and 11)
- Jeff Monachino – clearance
- Nicole Morier – backing vocals (track 5), songwriting (track 5)
- Balewa Muhammad – songwriting (track 3)
- Vernon Mungo – engineering (track 8)
- Jackie Murphy – art direction, design
- Glen Nakasako – art direction, design
- Farid "Fredwreck" Nassar – guitar (track 10), keyboards (track 10), production (track 10), songwriting (track 10)
- Candice Nelson – backing vocals (tracks 3 and 7), songwriting (track 3)
- Brian Paturalski – engineering (track 10), vocal engineering (track 5)
- Jenny Prince – A&R coordination
- J. Que – songwriting (tracks 3 and 7)
- Nancy Roof – A&R administration
- David Schmidt – clearance
- Rob Skipworth – engineering assistance (track 8)
- Britney Spears – executive production, songwriting (tracks 7 and 10), vocals (all tracks)
- Supa Engineer Duro – mixing (track 12)
- T-Pain – arrangement (track 9), backing vocals (track 9), songwriting (track 9)
- Ron Taylor – editing (tracks 1, 4, 6, 9 and 11)
- Francesca Tolot – make-up
- Valente – engineering assistance (track 1)
- Kristen Vallow – prop styling
- Ellen von Unwerth – photography
- Windy Wagner – backing vocals (track 9)
- Magnus "Mango" Wallbert – additional programming (track 8), songwriting (track 8)
- Teresa LaBarbera Whites – A&R
- Pharrell Williams – backing vocals (track 12), production (track 12), songwriting (track 12)
- Patti Wilson – styling
- Jordan "DJ Swivel" Young – additional engineering (track 12), mixing assistance (track 12)

== Charts ==
=== Weekly charts ===
Weekly chart performance during 2007-2008
Chart (2007–2008)	Peak position
Australian Albums (ARIA)	3
Australian Dance Albums (ARIA)	1
Austrian Albums (Ö3 Austria)	6
Belgian Albums (Ultratop Flanders)	17
Belgian Albums (Ultratop Wallonia)	6
Brazilian Albums (Pro-Música Brasil)	3
Canadian Albums (Billboard)	1
Croatian Albums (HDU)	48
Czech Albums (ČNS IFPI)	27
Danish Albums (Hitlisten)	6
Dutch Albums (Album Top 100)	14
European Top 100 Albums (Billboard)	1
Finnish Albums (Suomen virallinen lista)	22
French Albums (SNEP)	2
German Albums (Offizielle Top 100)	10
Greek Albums (IFPI)	3
Hungarian Albums (MAHASZ)	24
Irish Albums (IRMA)	1
Italian Albums (FIMI)	6
Japanese Albums (Oricon)	4
Mexican Albums (Top 100 Mexico)	2
New Zealand Albums (RMNZ)	8
Norwegian Albums (VG-lista)	12
Polish Albums (ZPAV)	24
Portuguese Albums (AFP)	10
Scottish Albums (Official Charts)	3
Spanish Albums (Promusicae)	11
Swedish Albums (Sverigetopplistan)	11
Swiss Albums (Schweizer Hitparade)	4
Taiwanese Albums (Five Music)	2
UK Albums (Official Charts)	2
US Billboard 200	2

Weekly chart performance during 2023
Chart (2023)	Peak position
Spanish Albums (PROMUSICAE)	44

=== Monthly charts ===
2007 monthly chart performance
Chart	Peak position
Argentine Albums (CAPIF)	9
South Korean International Albums (RIAK)	3
Uruguayan Albums (CUD)	7

=== Year-end charts ===
2007 year-end chart performance
Chart	Position
Australian Albums (ARIA)	56
Australian Dance Albums (ARIA)	5
Belgian Albums (Ultratop Wallonia)	97
French Albums (SNEP)	138
Mexican Albums (Top 100 Mexico)	87
Russian Albums (2M)	4
UK Albums (OCC)	130
US Billboard 200	138
Worldwide Albums (IFPI)	32

2008 year-end chart performance
Chart	Position
Australian Albums (ARIA)	83
Australian Dance Albums (ARIA)	10
Russian Albums (2M)	1
UK Albums (OCC)	110
US Billboard 200	85

== Certifications ==
Certifications and sales
Region	Certification	Certified units/sales
Australia (ARIA)	Platinum	70,000^{^}
Belgium (BRMA)	Gold	15,000^{*}
Brazil (Pro-Música Brasil)	Gold	30,000^{*}
Canada (Music Canada)	2× Platinum	200,000^{‡}
France (SNEP)	Gold	75,000^{*}
Germany (BVMI)	Gold	100,000^{‡}
Hungary (MAHASZ)	Gold	3,000^{^}
Ireland (IRMA)	Platinum	15,000^{^}
Italy (FIMI)	Gold	40,000^{*}
Japan (RIAJ)	Gold	100,000^{^}
New Zealand (RMNZ)	Gold	7,500^{^}
Norway	—	8,200
Poland (ZPAV)	Platinum	20,000^{‡}
Russia (NFPF)	3× Platinum	60,000^{*}
South Korea	—	7,464
United Kingdom (BPI)	Platinum	300,000^{‡}
United States (RIAA)	2× Platinum	2,000,000^{‡}
Summaries
Worldwide	—	3,100,000
^{*} Sales figures based on certification alone.^{^} Shipments figures based on certification alone.^{‡} Sales+streaming figures based on certification alone.

== Release history ==
Release dates and formats
Region	Date	Format(s)	Label(s)	Ref.
Italy	October 25, 2007	CD	Sony BMG	
Spain	October 25, 2007	CD; digital download	Sony BMG	
Germany	October 26, 2007	CD; digital download	Sony BMG	
Italy	October 26, 2007	Digital download	Sony BMG	
Australia	October 27, 2007	CD	Sony BMG	
France	October 29, 2007	CD; digital download	Jive	
Poland	October 29, 2007	CD	Sony BMG	
United Kingdom	October 29, 2007	CD	Jive	
Canada	October 30, 2007	CD; digital download	Sony BMG	
United States	October 30, 2007	CD; digital download	Jive	
Denmark	October 31, 2007	CD	Sony BMG	
Sweden	October 31, 2007	CD	Sony BMG	
Brazil	November 1, 2007	CD; digital download	Sony BMG	
South Korea	November 1, 2007	CD	Sony BMG	
Japan	November 14, 2007	CD	BMG Japan	
United States	March 31, 2023	Vinyl (Note: Prior to the 2023 vinyl release, Blackout was made available on cassette, and in three different vinyl variants, exclusively at Urban Outfitters.)	Legacy	
Australia	April 28, 2023	Vinyl	Sony	
Europe	April 28, 2023	Vinyl	Sony	

== See also ==
- Britney Spears discography
- List of number-one albums of 2007 (Canada)
- List of number-one albums of 2007 (Ireland)
- Rolling Stone's 500 Greatest Albums of All Time
