= NRJ (Lebanon) =

NRJ Radio Lebanon
- Beirut; Lebanon
- Frequency: 99.1 MHz
- RDS: [__NRJ___]
- Branding: NRJ

Programming
- Language: English
- Format: Top 40

Ownership
- Owner: C.Z

History
- First air date: 2006; 20 years ago

Technical information
- ERP: 50 kW

Links
- Website: www.nrjlebanon.com

NRJ Lebanon was a radio station founded in 2006 by Jyad (Jihad El Murr) which is also part of the RML Group. NRJ Lebanon had one main frequency in Lebanon which is FM 99.1.

NRJ Lebanon targets young audience, trendy and up to date in music, NRJ programs are mainly in English with major British presenters, except for few live shows from NRJ France and some interviews made by NRJ France for international artists.

Since the pandemic, the radio station had bad signal, looping songs, unchanged playlists for unknown reasons which led to the disappearance of the station without any notice. As of 2023, the frequency either has no signal or receives a station broadcasting Islamic content. The TV channel, which used to be called NRJ Hits is now just called Hits TV and is not well maintained.

As of 2024, the station got replaced by One FM, which is also owned by Murr. It plays Arabic music and targets a different audience.

== Current Hosts ==
- Sarah Gharzeddine
- Steve Peters

From 2011 to 2013, Jack Sleiman was the host and producer of “The Jack Sleiman Show” at NRJ Lebanon.

== Shows ==
- Energy Morning Live with Sara from Monday to Friday starting from 7:00 AM till 10:00AM
- Energy Top 20 with Steve Peters every Friday starting from 7:00PM till 8:00PM
- EuroHot 30 hosted by Steve Peters every Sunday starting from 7:00PM till 8:00PM
- NRJ Extravadance every Friday & Saturday starting from 8:00PM till 3:00AM

== NRJ Music Tour ==
NRJ Music Tour is a once a year event bringing a selection of artists each year to perform in Lebanon.

== DJs perform on NRJ Extravadance ==
Time	Friday	Saturday
8-9 PM	Base	ED'N'RAY
9 -10 PM	Stereokultur	DnK
10-11 PM	Josh	Morgan Nagoya
11-12 PM	Steve Aoki / Dannic / The Chainsmokers/ Lost Frequencies	Martin Garrix
12-1 AM	Felix Jaehn / Timmy Trumpet / Oliver Heldens	Pierre G
1-2 AM	Sam Feldt	Afrojack
2-3 AM	Anthony	HousehertZ
