= Giana's Return =

- Developer: Retroguru
- Designers: Coder: Rodolphe Boixel (Thor), Levels: Shahzad Sahaib (Kojote); Graphics: Jane S. Mumford (Jayne) Adam Karol (Wizzard) Simon Butler Virgil Metier (tHUG) Christian Hildenbrand (DayDream)
- Composers: Alexander Oldemeier (Operator); David Wuttke (AM-FM)
- Platforms: Amiga OS4; AROS; Caanoo; Dingoo A320; Dreamcast; GameCube; GCW Zero; GP2X; Linux 32 & 64 bit Mac OSX PPC & x86 MotoMagx; NetBSD PPC & x86 Pandora; PSP; Raspberry Pi; Symbian OS; Wii; Windows 32 bit WiZ
- Release: 15 August 2009
- Genre: Platform
- Mode: Single-player

Giana's Return is a fan-made sequel to the videogame The Great Giana Sisters. A German-Austrian-French team, the founders of the independent studio Retroguru in 2011, developed the game from 1998 to 2014.

== Plot ==
One night, while dreaming, Giana returns to the land she had first visited in the original Giana Sisters. She discovers that her sister, Maria, has been captured and brought to this land, and so Giana sets out to free Maria from the monster - known as Swampy - that captured her.

== Gameplay ==
The game is a classic 2D-side-scrolling platformer. Many enemies are similar to those seen in the original Great Giana Sisters. Giana can defeat them by jumping onto their head or by shooting them if she has the correct power up. The last boss is defeated after picking up all rubins of this specific level.

The Game is divided into 7 different worlds, each containing 8 levels. Every world ends with a boss fight. Several bonus areas and warpzones (in levels 7, 10, 12, 16, 20, 24, 29, 33, 40, 47, 51 and 54) are also part of the game.

Giana can take five hits before being defeated, and while most enemies deduct a single health point upon contact with Giana, bosses will cost her 3 hit points and environmental hazards such as spikes, bottomless pits and fires will instantly cause Giana to lose a life if she is not carrying a power up. After collecting all items without dying she wears a knight armor and will lose only 2 hit points. After every death, Giana spawns at the start of the level. The game has a password system that allows the player to skip to a later level. There is also a level skip program, which is hidden in level one.

The chiptune music, which is similar to Chris Hülsbeck's original score, changes every four levels. The game is downloadable from its dedicated website in versions for a multitude of operating systems and consoles. All in all, 23 separate ports have been made for systems such as Windows and MacOS computers, along with more exotic devices such as the Linux-based handheld Pandora or Amiga computers. Before the game begins the player can choose between English, German, French or Spanish language versions. The opening credits acknowledge Armin Gessert, the programmer of the original game, who died in 2009.

Much like the boxart of The Great Giana Sisters, the grown woman in the cutscenes between levels bears little resemblance to the Giana that is available in gameplay.

== Development ==
The project began in 1998. The software developer Rainer Sinsch (who used the online pseudonym Myth) won the game-development-event Mekka & Symposium in Bad Fallingbostel (Germany) in the 32K-competition with his remake of The Great Giana Sisters known as Giana 32K which he created over a period of three days. This game contained only seven levels. Here he first met the man who would later become the head of the Giana's Return project, Shahzad Sahaib (who was known as Kojote).

Together they formed a team that developed The Great Giana Worlds, a game for Windows computers with DirectX-support, that was presented in 1999 at Evoke, one of the largest demopartys held annually in Germany. By releases onto different computermagazine-CDs in Germany the game was quite famous within a short time. Because of this, the copyright owner of the original game, Armin Gessert, threatened to sue the team. He dropped the threat after the team renamed their project Gaint Worlds, but Myth had lost interest in the project.

In order to continue development Kojote, who had been the level designer on Giana Worlds, brought together a new team. Work with the new coder, known as CHN, started at the end of 2001. In 2004 the beta version of Giana's Return was completed. CHN then abandoned the project and did not leave behind any code for the team to work off of.

The project began anew in 2004 with another coder, Rodolphe Boixel (known as Thor), but in 2008 the project was almost cancelled yet again. The owners of the copyright to the original Great Giana Sisters, Spellbound Entertainment, planned the release of the official remake, known as Giana Sisters DS, in 2009. The Giana's Return team contacted Gessert again and he, Manfred Trenz and Chris Hülsbeck allowed their development to continue under the conditions that the game would be released for free and that the game would not be ported to the Nintendo DS or the iPhone.

Around this time, some of the game's graphic designers left the team without warning, further delaying the game's release. Giana's Return version 0.99 was finally released with the presentation at the Swiss Buenzli 18 on 15 August 2009. Version 1.0 was released in 2011, and a patch, v1.1, was added in 2014.
