= Giana =

Giana may refer to:

== Multimedia ==
- The Great Giana Sisters, 1987 platform game
- Giana Sisters DS, 2009 platform game developed by Spellbound Interactive for the Nintendo DS, iPad, iPhone, and Android
- Giana Sisters: Twisted Dreams, 2012 platform game developed by Black Forest Games for Microsoft Windows

== Name ==
- Feminine: Gianna, Gia, Giovanna, Jane
- Masculine: Gianni, Giovanni

== People ==
=== First name ===
- Giana Roberge (born 1970), American female road cycle racer
- Giana Romanova (born 1954), female middle-distance runner who represented the USSR
- Gia'na Garel, writer, producer, filmmaker, composer and entertainment consultant based in New York City

=== Surname ===
- Adalgisa Giana (1888–1970), Italian operatic soprano
- Tom Gianas (born 1964), American comedy writer, director and producer

== Other uses ==
- A.S. Giana Erminio, an Italian football club based in Gorgonzola, Lombardy
