= Giana Sisters: Dream Runners =

2015 video game

- Developer: Black Forest Games
- Publisher: EuroVideo Medien
- Composer: Chris Huelsbeck
- Series: Giana Sisters
- Platforms: PlayStation 4, Xbox One, Windows
- Release: August 19, 2015 (PS4, XBO); August 26, 2015 (PC)
- Genres: Platformer, Racing game
- Mode: Multiplayer

Giana Sisters: Dream Runners is a platformer and racing game that is part of the Giana Sisters series. It was developed by Black Forest Games and published by EuroVideo Medien. The game was released on August 19, 2015 for PlayStation 4 and Xbox One, and on August 26, 2015 for Windows. The game, which resembles a clone of SpeedRunners, involves 4 players racing on a 2.5D track through fantasy locales. Unlike its predecessor, Giana Sisters: Twisted Dreams, it was poorly received by critics, who said that it had potential, but failed to live up to it.

== Reception ==
C. Schilling of GamesRadar+ rated the game very poorly, calling it one of the worst games of 2015. While he called the idea "solid", he noted that "none of it works", and that the poor level design caused them to fail as both platform stages and race tracks at once. He said that the game was better in local multiplayer, but still did not recommend it. Adam Ramsey of Push Square called it "a hot mess to play", and Play4 magazine also rated it poorly.
