= Phantom Shadow =

Studio album by Machinae Supremacy
- Released: 22 August 2014
- Recorded: 2014
- Genre: Power metal, alternative metal, chiptune

Machinae Supremacy chronology
Rise of a Digital Nation (2012)	Phantom Shadow (2014)	Into the Night World (2016)

Phantom Shadow is the sixth album by Swedish metal band Machinae Supremacy, released on 22 August in central Europe, 25 August in the UK and 26 August in the US. The composition of the album is said to be complex and consist of many layers. It was confirmed to be a concept album by the band on their Facebook page.

== Track listing ==
No.	Title	Length
1.	"I Wasn't Made for the World I Left Behind"	0:43
2.	"The Villain of This Story"	5:46
3.	"Perfect Dark"	3:50
4.	"Europa"	7:00
5.	"Throne of Games"	6:10
6.	"Meanwhile (in the Hall of Shadows)"	0:37
7.	"Phantom Battle"	3:49
8.	"Captured (Sara's Theme)"	2:02
9.	"Renegades"	6:16
10.	"Beyond Good and Evil"	6:34
11.	"The Second One"	5:06
12.	"Redemption (Was Never Really My Thing)"	0:34
13.	"The Bigger They Are the Harder They Fall"	4:31
14.	"Versus"	6:02
15.	"Mortal Wound (Skye's Requiem)"	1:11
16.	"Hubnester Rising"	6:29
Total length:		01:06:40

== Personnel ==
- Robert Stjärnström – vocals
- Jonas Rörling – guitar, backing vocals
- Tomi Luoma – guitar
- Andreas Gerdin – bass, keyboards, backing vocals
- Niklas "Nicky" Karvonen – drums

Additional personnel

- Henkka Niemistö – mastering
- Ingeborg Ekeland – guest vocals
- Chika Forsman – guest vocals, narrations
- Bjarte Sebastian Hansen, George Lever, Chris Cook – sound engineers
