= Deus Ex Machinae (album) =

Studio album by Machinae Supremacy
- Released: 1 May 2004
- Recorded: 2003
- Studio: Luleå
- Genre: Power metal, chiptune
- Length: 72:33
- Label: MbD Records UK/Hubnester Industries reprint

Machinae Supremacy chronology
Deus Ex Machinae (2004)	Redeemer (2006)

Alternative cover
- DXM 2.0 cover

Deus Ex Machinae is the debut album by Swedish metal band Machinae Supremacy.

Released by Music by Design (MbD) Records UK in 2004, there were initially only 1,000 copies made. In 2005, a further 1,000 were printed featuring remastered tracks, new cover art and a bonus track. In 2006, further copies were printed via Hubnester Industries. In 2012, the album was released as a free download from band's official website.

The album was recorded in Blind Dog Studios and Lilla Tomtestudion, Luleå. All songs were composed, written and performed by Machinae Supremacy.

== Track listing ==
1. "Insidious" – 5:36
2. "Super Steve" – 5:39
3. "Dreadnaught" – 4:05
4. "Flagcarrier" – 6:02
5. "Return to Snake Mountain" – 5:18
6. "Player One" – 5:43
7. "Deus Ex Machinae" – 4:44
8. "Attack Music" – 3:35
9. "Ninja" – 5:23
10. "Throttle and Mask" – 3:59
11. "Killer Instinct" – 3:53
12. "Tempus Fugit" – 4:58
13. "Blind Dog Pride" – 6:25
14. "Machinae Prime" – 7:12 (instrumental)

Reissue bonus track:
15. "Soundtrack to the Rebellion" – 6:00

Early in production, some songs were given different titles, such as "Player One" which was originally titled "Player One (Return to Arcade)". The song "Deus Ex Machinae" was at one point titled "Hyperion".

== Personnel ==
- Robert Stjärnström – vocals, guitar, art and design
- Jonas Rörling – guitar, backing vocals
- Kahl Hellmer – bass
- Andreas Gerdin – keyboards, backing vocals
- Tomas Nilsén – drums

Additional personnel

- Thomas Eberger – mastering
- Jens Habermann – additional art
- Erica Öberg of Inja – vocals on "Flagcarrier"
- Stefan Sundström – sound engineer
