= Radar (song) =

2009 single by Britney Spears

Single by Britney Spears

from the album Circus
- Released: June 22, 2009
- Recorded: November 8, 2006
- Studio: Sony (New York)
- Genre: Electro; Eurodisco; electronic-disco
- Length: 3:49
- Label: Jive
- Songwriters: Ashton Cole; Henrik Jonback; Balewa Muhammad; Candice Nelson; Ezekiel "Zeke" Lewis; Patrick "J. Que" Smith
- Producers: Bloodshy & Avant; The Clutch

Britney Spears singles chronology
"If U Seek Amy" (2009)	"Radar" (2009)	"3" (2009)

Music video
- "Radar" on YouTube

"Radar" is a song recorded by American singer Britney Spears for her fifth studio album Blackout (2007). It was written by the Clutch and Henrik Jonback, and produced by Bloodshy & Avant and the Clutch. The recording sessions took place the day after Spears filed for divorce from Kevin Federline, and members of the Clutch claimed to be surprised by her work ethic. "Radar" was originally planned to be released as the third single from Blackout, but "Break the Ice" was chosen instead. The song was then planned as the fourth single, but the release was cancelled as Spears began recording her sixth studio album, Circus (2008). "Radar" was later included on Circus, and officially released as the fourth and final single from the album on June 22, 2009, by Jive Records.

Musically, "Radar" runs through a midtempo dance groove. Spears' vocals are auto tuned and accompanied by sonar pulses and a heavy usage of distorted synthesizers. The lyrics refer to an attraction between the protagonist and a man, while she wonders if he knows what she is feeling. "Radar" received mixed reviews from critics; some called it one of the highlights of Circus, while others felt that it was over-produced and also criticized her vocals for being processed. In July 2008, "Radar" charted in the top 40 of Ireland and New Zealand, and inside the top ten in Sweden and El Salvador. After it was released as a single from Circus in 2009, the track performed poorly on the charts and failed to enter the top 40 in most countries.

The single's accompanying music video was directed by Dave Meyers, and pays tribute to the music video of Madonna's "Take a Bow" (1994). In the video, Spears is an aristocratic woman involved in a love triangle with two men who are polo players. The video received mixed reviews from critics, who complimented the fashion, but called the idea unoriginal. "Radar" was performed by Spears at The Circus Starring Britney Spears (2009), with the accompanying dance routine featuring her pole dancing.

== Background ==
The main instrumentation was recorded by Bloodshy & Avant at Bloodshy & Avant Studios in Stockholm, Sweden. In November 2006, Spears recorded "Radar" with Ezekiel Lewis and Patrick M. Smith of the Clutch at Sony Music Studios in New York City. Lewis had wanted to work with her for a long time and was motivated to produce something for her that was going to "help her project become a great project to come back with". Smith stated that the team tried to create a record "for the Britney Spears that we know and love" and that it did not "touch on anything that was really dealing with all the stuff that she was dealing with." Both commented that although Spears arrived late to the recording sessions, she caught them off guard with her efficiency and professionalism, with Lewis adding, "It was absolutely nuts, and she took directions very well. [...] I don’t know what I was expecting because we went in to cut that record the day after she filed divorce from Kevin [Federline]." The song was later mixed by Niklas Flyckt at Mandarine Studios in Stockholm, Sweden. "Radar" was originally planned to be released as the third single from Blackout, according to Lewis. "Break the Ice" was released instead and "Radar" was chosen as the fourth single. In July 2008, a physical promotional single was released in countries such as New Zealand and Sweden. However, a wider release was scrapped when Spears began recording new material for her sixth studio album, Circus. On May 7, 2009, the song was announced as the fourth single from Circus.

== Music and lyrics ==
"Radar" (2009)
A sample of Spears' "Radar". The song is an electro, Euro disco, and electronic disco song influenced by R&B, and rave music.

"Radar" runs through a midtempo dance groove. The song is an electro, Euro disco and electronic disco composition influenced by R&B, and rave music. It has a bouncy and skipping beat, and a repetitive melody reminiscent of a nursery rhyme. Spears' vocals are auto tuned and kept "more in the foreground", according to Jennifer Vineyard of MTV. Her voice is accompanied by sonar pulses and distorted synthesizers. The synthesizers have been compared by Kimberly Chou of The Michigan Daily to those of Soft Cell's "Tainted Love" (1981).

During the outro, Spears repeats Vocodered da-da-das. Critics noted that "Radar" is influenced by the music of Rihanna; Cameron Adams of the Herald Sun said the song sounds "like an inferior take" of Rihanna's single "SOS" (2006). Roger Friedman of Fox News said that along with "Break the Ice", "Radar" was more "straight-ahead electronic disco" than the rest of Blackout and added that it "sounds like Las Vegas goes Eurodisco." In the lyrics, Spears lets the subject know he is on her radar, while she lists the qualities the man has. Kimberly Chou said Spears' delivery "[is] so aggressive it's almost threatening." Spears sings lyrics such as "Confidence is a must / cockiness is a plus / edginess is a rush / edges I like 'em rough / A man with a Midas touch / Intoxicate me I'm a lush." During the bridge she sings "I got my eye on you / And I can't let you get away", making clear her attraction.

== Critical reception ==
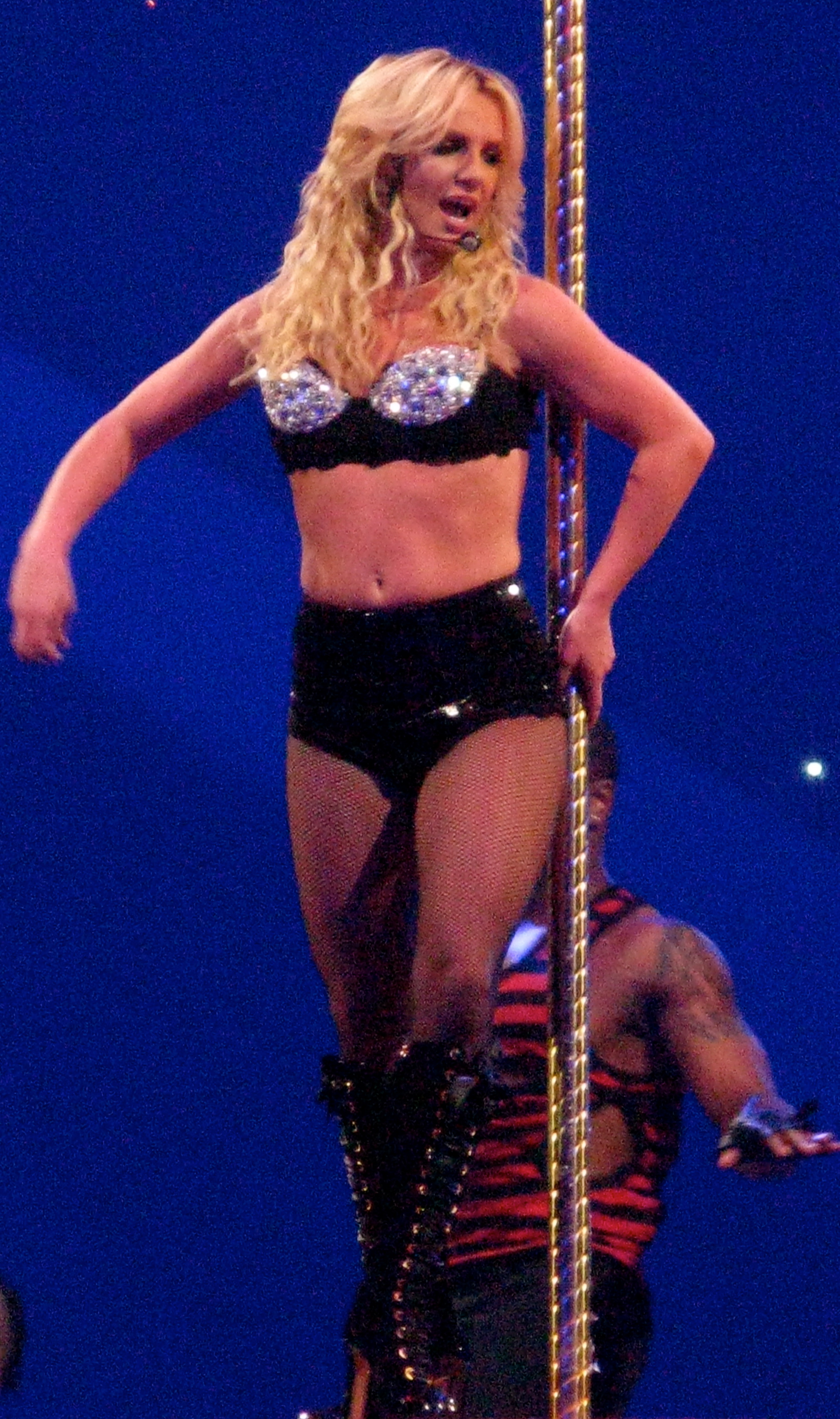
Spears performing "Radar" at The Circus Starring Britney Spears

Blender gave the song four and a half stars, named it the second potential hit from the album, and called it "a bubblegum-electro dance floor jam with a hook most pop stars would kill for". Eric R. Danton of The Hartford Courant deemed it as "crackling" and "club-ready", while calling it one of the "killer tracks" off the album along with "Break the Ice" and "Hot as Ice". Denton Record-Chronicle's Mike Daniel said the best tracks of Blackout are "the unwaveringly catchy 'Radar' and the neo-wave curveball of 'Heaven and Earth'". Stephen Thomas Erlewine of AllMusic said some of the songs of Blackout, "really show off the skills of the producers", exemplifying "Gimme More", "Radar", "Break the Ice", "Heaven on Earth" and "Hot as Ice". He also selected it as one of his 'track picks' of the album. Jedd Rosche of The Maneater deemed it as one of the standout tracks of Blackout along with "Ooh Ooh Baby."

Nekesa Mumbi Moody of USA Today called it "a sexy techno groove that you can't help but bounce to." Theon Weber of The Village Voice said that "Spears's writers present her with the goofiest, most vivacious productions she's ever had, filling 'Radar' with pinging noises and polishing Madonna's dance-floor trash bright." Nick Levine of Digital Spy called it "a rave-tinged electro blipathon on which Spears is vocodered to the point of sounding extra-terrestrial." Alexis Petridis from The Guardian said that the song "seems to be bending over backwards to annoy the listener. Perhaps it's a last desperate tactic to win back some privacy: she's trying to get people to leave her alone by making as irritating a noise as possible." A reviewer from the Ottawa Citizen said that "some tracks [of the album] just don't work, such as Radar, in which Britney's voice is tuned up so high she sounds like she's 14."

Laura Herbert of BBC News said that many of the album's songs, including "Radar" and "Toy Soldier" "are repetitive and over-produced." Jim Abbott of the Orlando Sentinel said that "Musically, songs such as 'Piece of Me,' 'Radar' and 'Break the Ice' are one-dimensional, robotic exercises." Chris Wasser from the Irish Independent said the album had single potential, exemplifying that "There's little doubting we'll hear the bouncing and digitally affected vocals of Radar and the livelier Hot As Ice on the radio soon enough, but both tracks still seem a little under par." After the release of "Radar" as a single from Circus, Nick Levine of Digital Spy said it "still sounds pretty ace, one of the best examples of the robopop sound Blackout essentially invented, but its fresh-out-the-box sheen has long since faded". On July 29, 2009, "Radar" was chosen as single of the week by FHM.

== Commercial performance ==
On November 17, 2007, due to digital downloads for the Blackout release, "Radar" peaked at number 52 on the US Billboard Hot Digital Songs and number seven on the US Billboard Bubbling Under Hot 100. The song also charted in several countries based on strong digital sales and airplay alone, surprisingly reaching high chart positions. In Ireland, the song debuted at number 47 on July 15, 2008. It peaked at number 32 on August 5, 2008. In Sweden, "Radar" debuted at number 46 on July 24, 2008. The single peaked at number eight on July 28, 2008, becoming the second highest-charting single from the album after "Gimme More". It stayed on the position for two weeks, and for eight weeks on the chart overall. In New Zealand, the song debuted at number 37 on August 18, 2008, and peaked at number 32 two weeks later. It stayed on the chart for five weeks.

After being confirmed as the fourth single from Circus, "Radar" re-entered the charts in several countries. On August 29, 2009, the song peaked at number 30 on the US Billboard Pop Songs. On September 5, 2009, "Radar" finally entered the Billboard Hot 100 at number 90, and peaked at number 88 on the following week. It became her fifth song from Circus to chart on the Hot 100, marking the first time five songs from one of her albums entered the chart. It was also her 22nd Hot 100 hit. "Radar" also became her 21st chart entry on the Pop Songs chart, the most for any artist of the decade at the time. As of July 2010, "Radar" has sold 481,000 paid digital downloads in the United States. On the same week, the song peaked at number 65 in Canada. The track re-entered the ARIA Singles Chart at number 46 on July 20, 2009, and stayed on the chart for just one week. In the UK, the song peaked at number 46 on August 2, 2009.

== Music video ==
=== Development ===
"She kind of filled [Madonna's] shoes. [But] everything is done in a Britney way. She's not Madonna, and Madonna is not Britney. It seems like Madonna made the same choices that were right for her at the time, to class her up when she had just done a sexpot video. She was riding that image train too. She was leading that image train, and I think that Britney has done that as well."

— Dave Meyers, explaining the tribute to the music video of Madonna's "Take a Bow".

In June 2008, a video for "Radar" was planned that would have Spears and her friends chasing a man in different clubs. However, this was scrapped along with the single's release. The music video for "Radar" from Circus was filmed on May 27 and 28, 2009, at the Bacara Resort & Spa located in Santa Barbara, California. It was directed by Dave Meyers, who previously worked with Spears on her music videos for "Lucky", "Boys", and "Outrageous" as well as the Curious commercials. Meyers claimed the video pays tribute to the music video of Madonna's 1994 single "Take a Bow". He added, "[we were] looking for a way to take her into a contemporary, classy environment. I felt empowered by referencing Madonna's video. Britney hasn't done anything like that". He had a very clear idea of how he wanted the story line to work: "There is a narrative going on, a romantic triangle on a weekend at this polo mansion," he said. "A soap-opera romance." Meyers commented that working with Spears again was "a great celebration of trusting one another", explaining that both wanted "to do something fresh and new, seeking out an actual different technique and stylistic choices and trying to find a form to celebrate them in." Since the song was not the first single from Circus, Meyers chose to experiment and not have dancing scenes, saying that "the videos are a chance for her to vocalize a sense of herself. The media tends to attack her, so I thought, 'Let's show the classy side of Britney and focus on a classy experience, very European-inspired'. And she's at the point in her career where I think this would be a nice step." After the video was finished, Meyers said he was happy with the lack of dancing scenes, because the cuts and dissolves kept the pace of the song.

=== Synopsis ===
The video begins with Spears arriving at a polo mansion. She comes out from the car wearing a vest, jeans and showing her midriff. She starts singing while her boyfriend welcomes her. They walk past a barn, where a polo player is sitting. They look at each other briefly and she starts to sing in a balcony, watching the second man with a pair of binoculars. At the end of the first chorus, her boyfriend comes and puts a studded necklace around her neck, as a surprise gift. Until the end of the second chorus, we see scenes of Spears singing and watching the polo player as he gets ready. His horse is also on her radar. When the bridge begins, Spears arrives at a match wearing a white dress and a large hat. She looks at the polo player over her shoulder and sings the lines "I got my eye on you / And I can’t let you get away". When the match ends, she leaves and the second man follows her. They flirt inside a hallway and leave. Her boyfriend notices her absence, walks into the hallway and sees her necklace on the floor. The video ends with Spears and the second man walking into the sunset.

=== Release and reception ===
The music video leaked online on July 1, 2009. Daniel Kreps of Rolling Stone said the music video was her weakest since "Gimme More" and highlighted the comparisons with "Take a Bow", saying, "while Madonna dressed the role of a distressed aristocratic senorita in the stands, Spears’ wardrobe and giant hat mirror the elite at the Kentucky Derby". He also said the idea was unoriginal and compared it to Spears' fragances commercials. Peter Gicas of E! commented that the video was a nice departure from her recent more choreographed videos, such as "Womanizer" and "If U Seek Amy". He commended it for its "more straightforward approach in telling a so-called story", but felt it was "a bit too much like one of those overly dramatic fragrance commercials". OK! said the video was "posh" and also noted the difference from her recent videos.

== Live performances and cover ==
Spears performed the song during The Circus Starring Britney Spears (2009). After the performance of "Piece of Me", there was a brief interlude in which acrobats hanging from fabric simulated a thunderstorm. Spears took the stage again to perform "Radar", which featured her pole dancing. She wore a black bra encrusted with Swarovski crystals, fishnet stockings and high-heeled laced up boots, designed by Dean and Dan Caten. Spears ended the performance with her and her dancers posing in the middle of the three-ring stage as a red curtain slowly descended in the closing. A contest in DanceJam.com was announced to promote the song. The contestants had to upload a video of them dancing to "Radar", and Spears and Jive Records picked the winner. In the revamped Britney: Piece of Me concert (2016), "Radar" plays during an interlude that features multiple excerpts of Spears' music videos. A cover version of the song by singer-songwriter Christopher Dallman was included in an extended play titled Sad Britney, released on November 9, 2009, along with covers of "...Baby One More Time", "Toxic", and "Gimme More".

== Usage in media ==
The song appears on the 2023 TV series Wilderness' third episode, titled "Repent at Leisure", while the character Liv, portrayed by Jenna Coleman, runs through the forest.

== Track listings and formats ==
Promotional CD single

1. "Radar" – 3:49
2. "Radar" (instrumental) – 3:48

Digital single

1. "Radar" – 3:48
2. "Radar" (Bloodshy & Avant Remix) – 5:39

Digital EP

1. "Radar" – 3:48
2. "Radar" (Bloodshy & Avant Remix) – 5:43
3. "Radar" (Manhattan Clique UHF Remix) – 5:53
4. "Radar" (Tonal Club Remix) – 4:55
5. "Radar" (Tonal Radio Remix) – 4:01

== Credits and personnel ==
- Backing vocals, Lead vocals – Britney Spears
- Writers, drums – Christian Karlsson, Pontus Winnberg, Henrik Jonback, Balewa Muhammad, Candice Nelson, Ezekiel "Zeke" Lewis, Patrick "J.Que" Smith
- Producers, drums – Bloodshy & Avant, the Clutch
- Mixing – Niklas Flyckt
- Assistant engineer – Jim Carauna
- Guitars – Henrik Jonback
- Keyboard, bass – Bloodshy & Avant
- Background vocals – Candice Nelson, Michaela Breen

== Charts ==
=== Weekly charts ===
2007–2009 weekly chart performance for "Radar"
Chart	Peak position
Australia (ARIA)	46
Belgium (Ultratip Bubbling Under Wallonia)	13
Brazil (Brasil Hot 100 Airplay)	89
Canada Hot 100 (Billboard)	65
Canada CHR/Top 40 (Billboard)	27
CIS Airplay (TopHit)	137
El Salvador (EFE)	6
France Download (SNEP)	44
Global Dance Tracks (Billboard)	27
Ireland (IRMA)	32
New Zealand (Recorded Music NZ)	32
Slovakia Airplay (ČNS IFPI)	90
Sweden (Sverigetopplistan)	8
UK Singles (Official Charts)	46
US Billboard Hot 100	88
US Pop Airplay (Billboard)	30
Venezuela Pop Rock (Record Report)	1

=== Year-end charts ===
2008 year-end chart performance
Chart	Position
Lebanon (NRJ)	58

2009 year-end chart performance
Chart	Position
Brazil (Crowley Broadcast Analysis)	56

== Certifications ==
Certifications and sales
Region	Certification	Certified units/sales
United States (RIAA)	Platinum	1,000,000^{‡}
^{‡} Sales+streaming figures based on certification alone.

== Release history ==
Release dates and formats
Region	Date	Format(s)	Version(s)	Label(s)	Ref.
United States	June 22, 2009	Contemporary hit radio	Original	Jive	
France	July 23, 2009	Digital download (EP)	Original; remixes	Jive	
Mexico	July 23, 2009	Digital download (EP)	Original; remixes	Sony	
Sweden	July 23, 2009	Digital download (EP)	Original; remixes	Sony	
United States	November 10, 2009	Digital download	Original; Bloodshy & Avant Remix	Jive	
Germany	November 23, 2009	Digital download	Original; Bloodshy & Avant Remix	Sony	
