= Sad Britney =

EP by Christopher Dallman
- Released: November 9, 2009
- Recorded: 2009
- Genres: Folk, alternative, cover album
- Length: 11:53
- Label: Beauteous Bird
- Producers: Rachel Alina, Barrie Maguire

Christopher Dallman chronology
| Never Was (2009) | Sad Britney (2009) |

Sad Britney is the third EP from American singer-songwriter Christopher Dallman. It was released on November 9, 2009 by Beauteous Bird Records. After hearing Dallman's cover of Britney Spears's "Gimme More", producer Rachel Alina suggested releasing an EP of Spears's songs to bring attention to his music. The EP also included covers of "Radar", "Toxic" and "... Baby One More Time". All the songs were recorded during the first day of the recording of his second EP, Never Was. The EP became Dallman's first record to chart on iTunes. His music video for "Gimme More" received attention from Spears's fans who misinterpreted his message and thought he was parodying her, which he denied.

== Background ==
In late 2007, Dallman played a cover of Spears's "Gimme More" (2007), which was her current single at the time, in many of his live performances. He had previously done many "folky cover[s]" of popular pop songs. He explained that "My own songs tend to lean toward the blue, so every once in a while a cover is a nice to thing change the pace and break up the mood a bit". In 2009, Dallman's friend and web designer Sean Akers moved to Los Angeles and started pushing him to record music again. Akers introduced him to another singer-songwriter, Philadelphia-based George Stanford. Rachel Alina, who was the assistant engineer on his 2004 debut album Race the Light, also moved to Los Angeles the same year. She and Dallman reconnected, and he said that at that moment, "I knew that I had someone that would make me feel safe enough in the studio to really open up and let out the love". Dallman showed Alina his cover of "Gimme More", which she "loved". Alina, along with Akers, suggested a project of Spears's covers, which could raise his profile and bring his music to new audience as well as, Dallman explained, "[making] a really fucking cool little record". He spent the next few days in his apartment, making arrangements to three more Spears songs, "...Baby One More Time" (1998), "Toxic" (2004) and "Radar" (2007). Alina also introduced him to Barrie Maguire, who used to be a member of American rock band The Wallflowers.

== Recording ==
Dallman, Alina and Maguire entered Redstar Studios in Los Angeles to record his next EP, Never Was. It was the first time Dallman had entered a recording studio in five years and he felt anxious whether he could deliver or not. During the first day, they "decided to have some fun" and "play around" with the covers. "Toxic" and "Gimme More" were the first to be recorded, with the first one "com[ing] together really quickly". Dallman was convinced "...Baby One More Time" was not going to work until George Stanford suggested adding a horn track to the song. "Radar" was the last to be recorded, which Dallman deemed his favorite. The guitar and vocals for the four covers were recorded during the day. The following days, they started to work on Never Was, but listened to Sad Britney as Dallman explained, "every once in a while whenever our heads got too deep". He ultimately decided to release the EP, saying, "As we added each new production element to the songs, they got better and better. We really loved it".

== Release and promotion ==
Sad Britney was released on November 9, 2009. The cover art was designed by Sean Akers. The same day it peaked at number six on the iTunes Singer-Songwriter chart, Dallman first record to chart. On December 8, 2009, he released a music video for "Gimme More", consisting of pictures of him and his friends Liz and Josh going out at night. He explained that, "I have no money for promotion and must make the most of the resources that I have at my disposal. [...] While it’s clearly an evening of debauchery, the energy of the clip is positive and fun and doesn’t have any of the darkness Britney’s video has". The video attracted many viewers and Dallman commented on the situation,

"I definitely found a bunch of new besties after that video, but doing anything 'Britney' also opens one up to a whole crop of 'haters', I’ve discovered. I’ve gotten tons of mean messages in a variety of different languages and I will definitely do my best to avoid the temptation of reading YouTube comments ever again! [...] I would love to know [if Spears likes the EP]. There have been a few folks who have misinterpreted what I was doing and thought that I was somehow making fun of her, which really isn’t the case. I have such a place in my heart for Britney, particularly the Blackout album. Every song on that record is top-notch pop and is exactly what it wants to be. There’s a place for everything".

On December 10, 2009 during one of his concerts, he played the four covers in the order they are in the EP. On January 29, 2010, Dallman announced he had no plans to release the EP on CD.

== Track listing ==
| No. | Title | Writer(s) | Length |
|---|---|---|---|
| 1. | "Gimme More" | Nate Hills, James Washington, Keri Hilson, Marcella Araica | 2:24 |
| 2. | "Radar" | Christian Karlsson, Pontus Winnberg, Henrik Jonback, Balewa Muhammad, Candice Nelson, Ezekiel "Zeke" Lewis, Patrick "J.Que" Smith | 3:10 |
| 3. | "Toxic" | Bloodshy & Avant, Cathy Dennis, Henrik Jonback | 3:15 |
| 4. | "...Baby One More Time" | Max Martin | 3:04 |
