= A View from the End of the World =

Studio album by Machinae Supremacy
- Released: 3 November 2010
- Recorded: 2010
- Genre: Power metal, alternative metal, chiptune
- Length: 61:47
- Label: Spinefarm Records

Machinae Supremacy chronology
Overworld (2008)	A View from the End of the World (2010)	Rise of a Digital Nation (2012)

A View from the End of the World is the fourth album by Swedish metal band Machinae Supremacy, released on 3 November 2010.

== Track listing ==
Official track listing released by the band:

1. "A View from the End of the World" – 3:52
2. "Force Feedback" – 5:34
3. "Rocket Dragon" – 4:51
4. "Persona" – 5:16
5. "Nova Prospekt" – 5:13
6. "World of Light" – 1:14
7. "Shinigami" – 4:08
8. "Cybergenesis" – 5:43
9. "Action Girl" – 4:12
10. "Crouching Camper Hidden Sniper" – 3:59
11. "Indiscriminate Murder is Counter-Productive" – 4:07
12. "One Day in the Universe" – 4:16
13. "The Greatest Show on Earth" – 3:31
14. "Remnant (March of the Undead IV)" – 5:54
