= Overworld (Machinae Supremacy album) =

Studio album by Machinae Supremacy
- Released: 19 August 2008
- Recorded: 2007–2008
- Genre: Power metal, alternative metal, chiptune
- Length: 52:19
- Label: Spinefarm Records

Machinae Supremacy chronology
Redeemer (2006)	Overworld (2008)	A View From The End of The World (2010)

Professional ratings
Review scores
Source	Rating
Archaic-Magazine	4/5 stars
HardcoreSounds	3/5 stars
LordsOfMetal	(8.9/10)
Metal-Minstrel	8.5/10 stars
Metal-Temple	3.5/5 stars
PyroMusic	8.5/10 stars

Overworld is the third album by Swedish metal band Machinae Supremacy, released on 19 August 2008.

== Track list ==
Official track listing released by the band.

1. "Overworld" – 4:21
2. "Need for Steve" – 4:11
3. "Edge and Pearl" – 4:00
4. "Radio Future" – 4:40
5. "Skin" – 5:24
6. "Truth of Tomorrow" – 4:35
7. "Dark City" – 5:56
8. "Conveyer" – 3:51
9. "Gimme More (SID)" – 3:32 (Britney Spears cover)
10. "Violator" – 3:04
11. "Sid Icarus" – 3:58 (Flight of the Toyota remake)
12. "Stand" – 4:47
