= Gimme More =

2007 single by Britney Spears

Single by Britney Spears

from the album Blackout
- Released: August 31, 2007
- Recorded: August–October 2006
- Studio: Conway (Los Angeles)
- Genre: Electroclash; dance-pop; electropop; EDM
- Length: 4:11
- Label: Jive
- Songwriters: Nate Hills; James Washington; Keri Hilson; Marcella Araica
- Producer: Danja

Britney Spears singles chronology
"Someday (I Will Understand)" (2005)	"Gimme More" (2007)	"Piece of Me" (2007)

Music video
- "Gimme More" on YouTube

"Gimme More" is a song by American singer Britney Spears from her fifth studio album, Blackout (2007). It was released on August 31, 2007, by Jive Records, as the lead single from the album. "Gimme More" was recorded in 2006 during Spears' second pregnancy and was one of the first solo productions by Danja. The song opens with an intro in which Spears utters the phrase, "It's Britney, bitch." Musically, "Gimme More" is a song with elements from dance-pop, electropop and EDM using breathy vocals. The track closes with a speak-sing outro by Danja.

The song received critical acclaim and peaked at number three on the US Billboard Hot 100, becoming Spears' second highest-peaking single at the time. It also peaked at the top of the charts in Canada, also charting with top-five positions in 14 countries. The accompanying music video, which premiered on October 5, 2007, portrays Spears as a stripper and features a break from Spears's highly choreographed music videos. The video received mixed to negative reviews from critics, who panned Spears's pole dancing as well as the lack of storyline. An alternative cut was leaked on July 18, 2011.

Spears first performed "Gimme More" at the 2007 MTV Video Music Awards on September 9, 2007, wearing a black, jewel-encrusted bikini. The performance was panned by many critics, who commented extensively on her singing, dancing and wardrobe, with one deeming it as "one of the worst to grace the MTV Awards". On September 10, 2007, Cara Cunningham (then known as Chris Crocker) uploaded a video on YouTube in response to the criticism titled "Leave Britney Alone!", which made her an Internet celebrity and attracted attention from the media. Spears has also performed "Gimme More" at the Femme Fatale Tour (2011) and Britney: Piece of Me (2013–2017). "Gimme More" has been covered and sampled by many artists, including Miley Cyrus, Sia, will.i.am, and Marié Digby.

== Background ==
"Gimme More" was co-written by Jim Beanz, Marcella "Ms. Lago" Araica, Nate "Danja" Hills and Keri Hilson, and was also produced by Danja. Spears started working with Danja in July 2006. He explained that the creative process was not difficult at first since he was "left to do pretty much whatever I wanted to", and "if she felt it, she was gonna ride with it. If she didn't, you'd see it in her face." Hilson said that she wrote the song with Spears in mind after Danja played her the instrumental, adding, "I just started singing, 'Give me, Give me,' and added a little more in and just having fun and messing around really." Spears began recording the track in Las Vegas in August 2006, while she was seven months pregnant with her second child, Jayden James. Recording continued at Spears' house in Los Angeles, California, three weeks after she gave birth. Hilson commented that "She gave 150 percent...I don't know any other mother that would do that." In an interview with Rhapsody, Danja commented that he added a speak-sing outro to "stake [his] claim", since "Gimme More" was one of his first solo productions. "There's a lot riding on my future, because people think I'm around because of Tim and they don't really know what I'm capable of", he said. The song was mixed by Ms. Lago at Chalice Recording Studios in Los Angeles. Background vocals were provided by Hilson and Beanz. "Gimme More" was released as the album's lead single and premiered on New York City-based radio station Z100's web site. A remix featuring rapper Lil' Kim (titled the "Kimme More" remix) was also made available for digital download.

== Composition ==
"Gimme More"
A 24-second sample of the chorus of "Gimme More"

"Gimme More" is a song incorporating elements from dance-pop, electropop, EDM, and pop. It is set in a moderate dance groove at a tempo of 113 beats per minute, with Spears vocal range spanning from F♯_{3} to C_{6}. The song was composed in the key of F♯ minor, though the key of the final recording is sharp by a quarter tone. The melody incorporates "low electronic lines" whereas the beat has been described by Bill Lamb of About.com as "disco-ish". Nick Levine of Digital Spy compared Spears's vocals to those of her single "I'm a Slave 4 U" (2001). Lamb described them as "teasing...backed by moaning and heavy breathing" reminiscent of Donna Summer's "Love to Love You Baby" (1975). Sal Cinquemani of Slant Magazine felt the song was reminiscent of Sabrina's "Boys (Summertime Love)" (1987).

"Gimme More" is constructed in the common verse-chorus form. The song opens with a spoken intro in which Spears says the line "It's Britney, bitch". The chorus consists of the repetition of the hookline "Gimme gimme", that ends with a constantly pitch-shifted "More". The song closes with a speak-sing outro by Danja in which he says the lines "Bet you didn't see this one coming / The Incredible Lago, the legendary Ms. Britney Spears / and the unstoppable Danja".

== Critical reception ==
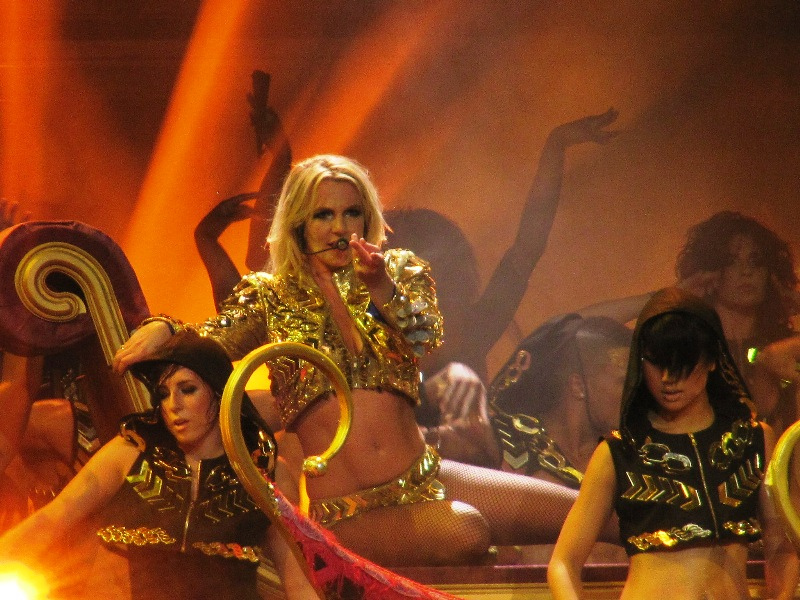
Spears performing "Gimme More", during the Femme Fatale Tour in 2011

"Gimme More" garnered universal acclaim from music critics. Dennis Lim of Blender named the song one of the highlights of the album, calling it "hypnotic pole-dance pop". Alexis Petridis of The Guardian called the song "futuristic and thrilling". Nick Levine of Digital Spy said that "somehow, out of personal chaos, pop greatness has emerged. [Danja] melds tack-sharp beats and a deliciously scuzzy bassline to create a dancefloor throb that feels devilishly sexy". While reviewing The Singles Collection, Evan Sawdey of PopMatters called "Gimme More" "the best dance track she has done since 'Toxic'". Kelefa Sanneh of The New York Times said the track set the mood for Blackout, adding that "the electronic beats and bass lines are as thick as Ms. Spears's voice is thin...she delivers almost nothing but slithery come-ons and defiant invitations to nightclub decadence". New Musical Express compared Spears's vocals to "a sex addict's cry for help". Stephen Thomas Erlewine of AllMusic said some of the songs of Blackout, "really show off the skills of the producers", exemplifying "Gimme More", "Radar", "Break the Ice", "Heaven on Earth" and "Hot as Ice".

Bill Lamb of About.com gave the song three and a half stars and commented, "It does seem that Britney's bump-and-grind singing style that we first heard 8 years ago on '...Baby One More Time' is still intact, and the 'It's Britney, bitch' announcement that opens the song implies a significant amount of fire remains. The opening alone bumps the song's rating up by half a star". Blogger Roger Friedman of Fox News dubbed the line as "cocky and fun". Eric R. Danton of The Hartford Courant wrote, "The comedy starts right away, when she plays the role of your drunk friend calling at 3 a.m., slurring, 'It's Britney, bitch'". Mike Schiller of PopMatters called the opening line "real value...kind of hilarious" and added that the "inserted "more" syllables in the chorus only add to the feel that this is a genetically engineered sort of dancefloor banger". Popjustice named "Gimme More" the tenth best song of 2007. The StarPhoenix listed it as the second most infectious song of the year. In 2026, Pitchfork listed it as one of the best electroclash songs of all time.

== Chart performance ==
It didn't bother me until nine months down the line. I was like, 'I wish she could've really nailed that [VMA] performance 'cause that really would have set it off.' It was still top five [on the Billboard] Hot 100...It definitely weighed on me. At one particular point last year, I felt like, 'Man, I did all this work, and it ain't pop like it's supposed to pop.' I was down for a little bit...You could put your all into the music, and it's some executive decision that ruined it...Every producer, songwriter or arranger on that record did their thing. The record label did their thing. That was just something uncontrollable on her part.

— Danja talking about the commercial performance of "Gimme More" not meeting his expectations.

On September 22, 2007, "Gimme More" debuted at number 85 on the US Billboard Hot 100. On October 13, 2007, the song peaked at number three on the chart. The same week, it also peaked at number one on the Billboard Hot Digital Songs, due to digital sales of 179,000 downloads. It became her fifth top ten hit in the Hot 100, as well as her highest peaking since "...Baby One More Time". On February 13, 2008, the single was certified platinum by the Recording Industry Association of America (RIAA) selling 1,000,000 copies. On December 15, 2007, it peaked at number one on the Billboard Hot Dance Club Songs. As of July 2016, "Gimme More" has sold 1,840,000 digital downloads in the United States. It is her seventh best-selling digital single in the country. In Canada, the song debuted at number 53 on September 22, 2007. On October 13, 2007, it peaked at number one and climbed from number 42, becoming the chart's "Greatest Gainer". It was certified two times platinum by the Canadian Recording Industry Association (CRIA) for sales of 160,000 copies.

In Australia, the single debuted at number three on the Australian Singles Chart on October 15, 2007. It received a gold certification by the Australian Recording Industry Association (ARIA) for shipments over 35,000 units. In New Zealand, it debuted at number 24 on October 1, 2007. The following week, it peaked at number 15. "Gimme More" was also successful in Europe, peaking at number two in the European Hot 100 Singles. In the United Kingdom, "Gimme More" debuted and peaked at number three on October 21, 2007 (for the week ending date October 27, 2007). According to the Official Charts Company, "Gimme More" has sold 596,000 copies there, as of August 2022. It also reached the top five in Belgium, Czech Republic, Belgium, Denmark, Ireland, Norway and Sweden and peaking inside the top ten in Austria and Finland.

== Music video ==
=== Background ===
The music video for "Gimme More" was filmed on July 19, 2007, at a warehouse in downtown Los Angeles, California, with additional scenes later being filmed on August 7, 2007, in the same location. It was directed by Jake Sarfaty, who was handpicked by Spears. According to People, the production was Spears's "concept and vision". Despite this, according to Mikal Sky, who worked as the makeup artist for the video, Spears "sabotaged the director by refusing to perform and follow the script" for unknown reasons. During filming, Spears was spotted wearing a short black dress, black boots and a black hat. On September 13, 2007, it was reported by The New York Times that the music video was being "tweaked with input from her advisers" since "[the] gritty, stripper-themed clip...may jolt fans who are more accustomed to the slick, tightly choreographed videos that made her an MTV staple". The music video premiered exclusively in the iTunes Store on October 5, 2007, and in all other outlets, including TRL on October 8, 2007, and on BET's 106 & Park on October 10, 2007.

=== Synopsis and reception ===
Spears in a scene of the music video, pole dancing in aura-like blue lighting

The video begins with a blonde Spears sitting and laughing in a bar with two female friends, but stops to look at a brunette Spears calling out to her on a small stage in front of them, wearing a leather vest, a studded belt, panties and fishnet stockings while sporting a tattoo on her biceps. She dances erotically around a pole and up against a mirror. Throughout the video, she continues to dance and flip her hair while special effects lights flash around her as the camera moves slightly in and out of focus to the beat of the song. The video's light systems change from black and white with aura-like blue and pink hues to full-blown color. Around the middle of the video, she is joined by two alter egos of her female friends, who also dance around the pole. The blonde Spears and her friends, while watching the dancing, later draw their attention to an attractive man sitting with his friends at a table across the bar.

In December 2025, the leather vest worn by Spears during the pole-dancing scenes in the music video was sold by Julien's Auctions for US$19,200. The vest was purchased by Brazilian collector Marcio Garcia for approximately R$110,000.

The music video received mixed to negative reviews from critics. Michael Slezak of Entertainment Weekly said "The moral of the story is, if you're going to build an entire video around a stripper pole, then you better work said pole like a nine-to-five. Drop it like it's hot...Alas, in the case of "Gimme More," I've seen sexier pole work during an afternoon of fly-fishing". Andrei Harmsworth of Metro commented "To her credit, the video is slightly less disappointing than her mimed performance of the track at the Video Music Awards last month but it is still smeared with the same smutty hallmarks". Dose said the video "sucks less than you think" and added "Spears appears lucid, sometimes happy, and awards-worthy editing makes her appear to be standing upright competently throughout". Sal Cinquemani of Slant Magazine said the lighting effects and digital body enhancement of the video "indicate a predilection toward maintaining an image that no longer reflects reality. It doesn't point to an artist who refuses to evolve, but rather one who doesn't know how—or isn't being allowed to." IGN writer Sketch Longwood called it one of Spears' hottest videos, adding that she "proves to be quite skilled in the art of teasingly slinking around." While reviewing the alternate version of the video in July 2011, Becky Bain of Idolator stated that "Spears's last few videos — particularly the joyfully silly clip for 'I Wanna Go' — more than makeup for the travesty that was the pop star's video for 'Gimme More'... The stripper concept was a poor choice, the barely-there outfits were ill-fitting, the 'choreography' was a joke, the editing was sloppy." Spears later wrote of the music video in her memoir The Woman in Me that it was, "by far the worst video I’ve ever shot in my life. I don’t like it at all—it’s so tacky. It looks like we only spent three thousand dollars to shoot it."

The video was spoofed by Eminem on his music video of "We Made You".

An alternative version of the video leaked online on July 18, 2011, and included new scenes, which featured Spears strutting down the street in a black outfit and laying down in a zebra-print bed with a cat. The scenes of blonde Spears were cut. Becky Bain of Idolator said that "Neither the deleted nor added parts add or subtract anything from the experience. This video was kind of doomed no matter how it was edited together."

== Live performances ==
=== MTV Video Music Awards ===
Kicking off the show Sunday night with her new single, 'Gimme More,' Spears looked bleary and unprepared – much like her recent tabloid exploits on the streets of Los Angeles. She lazily walked through her dance moves with little enthusiasm. It appeared she had forgotten the entire art of lip-synching; and, perhaps most unforgivable given her once taut frame, she looked embarrassingly out of shape. Even the celebrity-studded audience seemed bewildered. 50 Cent looked at Spears with a confused expression; Diddy, her new best friend, was expressionless. Some comeback.

— Nekesa Mumbi Moody, Associated Press.

After days of media speculation, it was confirmed on September 6, 2007, that Spears would open the 2007 MTV Video Music Awards at the Pearl Theatre in the Palms Hotel and Casino in Las Vegas, Nevada, on September 9, 2007. It was also announced that she was going to perform "Gimme More", with a magic act from illusionist Criss Angel in some parts of the performance. However, the bit is thought to have been rejected by the show's organizers at the last minute. Jesse Ignjatovic, the executive producer of the 2007 VMAs, contacted Spears since she wanted to start the show in "a very big and dramatic way", and was confident that Spears would deliver and set the tone for the rest of the night. She also said Spears was excited after she was approached by MTV to perform.

On September 7, 2007, Spears started rehearsing at the Pearl Theater. An exclusive video from the rehearsal was posted on MTV.com the following day. The performance began with a close-up of the back of Spears's head, and continued with Spears turning to the camera and lip synching the first lines of Elvis Presley's 1958 song "Trouble": "If you're lookin' for trouble, you came to the right place / If you're lookin' for trouble, look right in my face." "Gimme More" began, and the camera panned out to reveal Spears wearing a black, jewel-encrusted bikini and black boots. She was accompanied by male and female dancers dressed in black outfits. Several pole dancers danced in smaller stages around the audience. The backdrop videos featured images of chandeliers floating and silhouettes of women, which were compared by Gil Kaufman of MTV to the gun barrel and the title sequence of the James Bond series. At the end of the performance, Spears smiled and thanked the audience before leaving the stage.

The performance was universally panned by critics. Jeff Leeds of The New York Times said that "no one was prepared for Sunday night's fiasco, in which a listless Ms. Spears teetered through her dance steps and mouthed only occasional words in a wan attempt to lip-synch her new single". Vinay Menon of the Toronto Star commented Spears "looked hopelessly dazed. She was wearing the expression of somebody who had been deposited at the Palms Casino Resort by a tornado, one that promptly twisted away, taking her clothing and sense of purpose...[She was] lumbering, in slow motion, as if somebody had poured cement into her streetwalker boots". David Willis of BBC stated her performance would "go down in the history books as being one of the worst to grace the MTV Awards".

The day after the performance, American blogger Cara Cunningham (formerly Chris Crocker) posted a video on YouTube titled "Leave Britney alone!", in which she cried and defended Spears's performance, explaining that she did not want her to spiral out of control like Anna Nicole Smith, who had died in February 2007. Within the first 24 hours of its posting, the video accumulated over 2 million views. "Leave Britney alone!" turned Cunningham an internet celebrity, and was featured on television shows such as The View and The Tonight Show with Jay Leno. It was also parodied by dozens of other YouTube users, most famously by actor Seth Green. An editor for YouTube said "the melodramatic two-minute clip made Crocker an instant YouTube star" and named it one of the top videos of 2007. Wired named it the top video of 2007.

=== Other ===
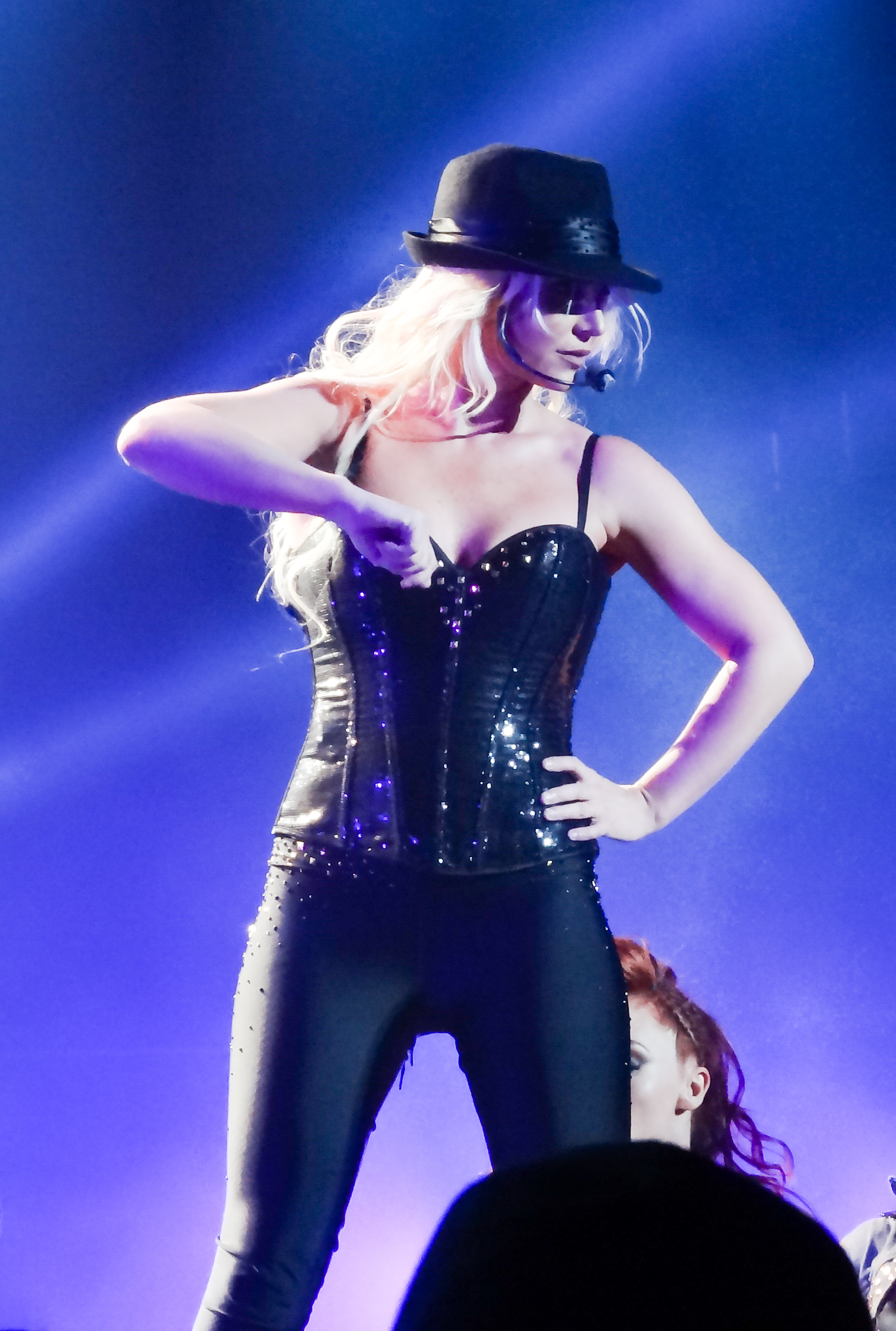
Spears performing the track during her Las Vegas residency show, Britney: Piece of Me, in 2014

During Spears's 2009 concert tour The Circus Starring Britney Spears, the LAZRtag Remix of "Gimme More" was used in a martial arts-inspired interlude between the first and second act. On March 25, 2011, Spears performed a special show at Rain Nightclub in Las Vegas. The setlist of the show consisted of three songs from her seventh studio album, Femme Fatale, including "Hold It Against Me", "Big Fat Bass" and "Till the World Ends". During the performance of "Big Fat Bass", Spears wore a latex bodysuit and elements of "3", "Gimme More" and "I'm a Slave 4 U" were also included. On March 27, 2011, "Big Fat Bass" was also performed at the Bill Graham Civic Auditorium that aired on Good Morning America on March 29, 2011, and the same day, Spears performed the set at Jimmy Kimmel Live!.

Spears also performed "Gimme More" at 2011's Femme Fatale Tour. After the performance of "If U Seek Amy", a video interlude in which a stalker talked about femme fatales in history saw the beginning of the third section. Spears returned to the stage wearing a golden bikini and made her entrance in a boat whose individual parts were wheeled by dancers in Egyptian costumes. Matt Kivel of Variety said, "the crowd reacted wildly to all of it: screaming out the chorus to 'I'm a Slave 4 U,' pulsating along to the twitch of 'Gimme More' and going absolutely ballistic for the brief, two-verse rendition of '...Baby One More Time.'" Craig S. Semon of Telegram & Gazette called it the most over the top number of the show, adding "She delivered the banal, brain-numbing chorus...while her dancers (looking like extras from 'Stargate') paraded around in Egyptian garb and basked in the glow of pyrotechnic sparks." Spears also performed the song at her residency show, Britney: Piece of Me (2013–2017).

== Cover versions, samples and media appearances ==
"Gimme More" has been covered by many artists and a great number of amateurs. In late 2007, American singer-songwriter Marié Digby posted an acoustic cover of "Gimme More" along with a cover of Rihanna's "Umbrella" in her YouTube account. Both became hits, with "Gimme More" gaining more than 300,000 views in two weeks. Shortly after, Digby became the eighth most subscribed-to artist on YouTube. She joked about the situation saying, "I could have done a karaoke video to ['Gimme More'], but I just had my stripper pole taken out the other day from my living room, and it just wouldn't have been the same". The same year, Australian pop singer Sia released an acoustic version of the song. Swedish metal band Machinae Supremacy covered the song on their third studio album Overworld, released on February 13, 2008. Matthieu De Ronde of Archaic Magazine commented "[it is] one of the most unexpected covers of all time...this track has been given a somewhat comical but enjoyable makeover, but who said that metal couldn't be fun?". American singer-songwriter Christopher Dallman played a cover of the song during many of his concerts in 2007. Two years later, he showed his version to his producer Rachel Alina, who prompted him to release an EP of Spears's covers. The EP, titled Sad Britney, was released on November 9, 2009, and also contained covers of "Radar", "Toxic" and "...Baby One More Time". It became Dallman's first record to chart on iTunes. He also released a music video for "Gimme More", which was criticized by Spears's fans who thought Dallman was making fun of her. He explained, "There have been a few folks who have misinterpreted what I was doing and thought that I was somehow making fun of her, which really isn't the case. I have such a place in my heart for Britney". American singer Slayyyter released an unauthorized remix of the song on April 25, 2020. In 2025, Swedish singer-songwriter Zara Larsson performed a cover of the song as a part of her opening setlist for the Miss Possessive Tour.

"Gimme More" has been sampled in many songs, including Girl Talk's "Give Me a Beat" (2008) and Charles Hamilton's "Devil in a Light Pink Dress" (2009). In the episode "Michael Scott Paper Company" of the television series The Office, the character of Michael Scott is driving his convertible listening to Lady Gaga's "Just Dance" (2008). When he stops the car, he looks into the camera and says "It's Britney, bitch", mistaking Gaga for Spears. During an episode of the television series Kath & Kim, the character of Brett Craig screams the catch phrase before starting a fight in a bar. During a skit in a 2008 episode of The Ellen DeGeneres Show, in which Ellen DeGeneres and Spears sang Christmas carols through a neighborhood, DeGeneres said the catch phrase when knocking on a door. "It's Britney, bitch" was also included in a video backdrop during the performance of "Human Nature" (1995) in Madonna's 2008–09 Sticky & Sweet Tour. In the video, Spears was trapped in an elevator and tried to get out. At the end of the performance, the doors opened to reveal Spears saying the catch phrase. On November 6, 2008, in the Los Angeles show at Dodger Stadium, Spears joined Madonna onstage halfway through the performance. In 2012, "Gimme More" was covered on Glee during its second Britney Spears tribute episode. "Britney 2.0" features "Gimme More" which is performed by Heather Morris and heavily parodies Spears's infamous 2007 MTV Music Video Awards performance. Spears and will.i.am's single "Scream & Shout" samples the phrase "Britney, bitch!". Rapper Jay-Z sampled the line "It's Britney, bitch!" in "BBC", a song on his 2013 album Magna Carta Holy Grail. The song appears in the 2019 American crime drama film Hustlers and appears as part of the track list for Just Dance 2024 Edition. The song also appeared as a soundtrack on Grand Theft Auto V on the radio station Non Stop Pop FM.

== Track listings ==
Australian CD single

1. "Gimme More" – 4:11
2. "Gimme More" (Instrumental) – 4:09

European CD single

1. "Gimme More" (Album Version) – 4:11
2. "Gimme More" (Kaskade Club Mix) – 6:08
3. "Gimme More" (Junkie XL Extended Mix) – 5:54
4. "Gimme More" (Seiji Dub) – 5:03
5. "Gimme More" (StoneBridge Club Mix) – 7:24
6. "Gimme More" (Music Video)

Remix EP

1. "Gimme More" (Paul Oakenfold Radio Mix) – 3:40
2. "Gimme More" (Kaskade Remix) – 3:20
3. "Gimme More" (Eli Escobar and Doug Grayson Remix Radio Edit) (feat. Amanda Blank) – 3:49
4. "Gimme More" (Paul van Dyk Club – Radio Edit) – 3:42
5. "Gimme More" (Junior Vasquez & Johnny Vicious Club Remix – Radio Edit) – 4:34

== Charts ==
=== Weekly charts ===
Weekly chart performance
Chart (2007–2008)	Peak position
Australia (ARIA)	3
Australian Dance (ARIA)	1
Austria (Ö3 Austria Top 40)	8
Belgium (Ultratop 50 Flanders)	5
Belgium (Ultratop 50 Wallonia)	4
Canada Hot 100 (Billboard)	1
Canada CHR/Top 40 (Billboard)	4
Canada Hot AC (Billboard)	28
CIS Airplay (TopHit)	7
Costa Rica (EFE)	8
Croatia (HRT)	4
Czech Republic (Rádio Top 100)	19
Denmark (Tracklisten)	2
El Salvador (EFE)	4
Europe (Eurochart Hot 100)	2
European Radio Top 50 (Billboard)	11
Finland (Suomen virallinen lista)	6
France (SNEP)	5
Germany (GfK)	7
Global Dance Tracks (Billboard)	2
Greece Digital Songs (Billboard)	6
Hungary (Dance Top 40)	19
Hungary (Editors' Choice Top 40)	17
Ireland (IRMA)	2
Italy (FIMI)	2
Mexico Anglo (Monitor Latino)	1
Netherlands (Dutch Top 40)	32
Netherlands (Single Top 100)	35
New Zealand (Recorded Music NZ)	15
Norway (VG-lista)	3
Romania (Romanian Top 100)	24
Russia Airplay (TopHit)	8
Scottish Singles Sales (Official Charts)	4
Slovakia (Rádio Top 100)	19
Sweden (Sverigetopplistan)	2
Switzerland (Schweizer Hitparade)	4
UK Singles (Official Charts)	3
Ukraine Airplay (TopHit)	43
US Billboard Hot 100	3
US Dance Club Songs (Billboard)	1
US Pop Airplay (Billboard)	17
US Rhythmic Airplay (Billboard)	36
US CHR/Top 40 (Radio & Records)	17
US Rhythmic (Radio & Records)	37

Chart (2025)	Peak position
Greece International (IFPI)	98

=== Year-end charts ===
Year-end chart performance
Chart (2007)	Position
Australia (ARIA)	46
Belgium (Ultratop 50 Flanders)	72
Belgium (Ultratop 50 Wallonia)	64
Brazil (Crowley Broadcast Analysis)	41
CIS (TopHit)	52
Ecuador (JC Radio La Bruja)	37
European Hot 100 Singles (Billboard)	50
France (SNEP)	87
Italy (FIMI)	25
Lebanon (NRJ)	20
Russia Airplay (TopHit)	64
Sweden (Sverigetopplistan)	41
Switzerland (Schweizer Hitparade)	61
UK Singles (OCC)	52
US Top 40 (Mediabase)	98
US CHR/Top 40 (Radio & Records)	87

Year-end chart performance
Chart (2008)	Position
European Hot 100 Singles (Billboard)	82
Hungary (Dance Top 40)	85

== Certifications and sales ==
Certifications
Region	Certification	Certified units/sales
Australia (ARIA)	Gold	35,000^{^}
Canada (Music Canada)	Gold	20,000^{*}
Canada (Music Canada) Mastertone	2× Platinum	80,000^{*}
Denmark (IFPI Danmark)	Platinum	15,000^{^}
France	—	48,870
Germany (BVMI)	Gold	150,000^{‡}
Italy (FIMI) (since 2009)	Gold	50,000^{‡}
New Zealand (RMNZ)	2× Platinum	60,000^{‡}
Spain (Promusicae)	Gold	30,000^{‡}
United Kingdom (BPI)	2× Platinum	1,200,000^{‡}
United States (RIAA)	4× Platinum	4,000,000^{‡}
Streaming
Greece (IFPI Greece)	Platinum	2,000,000^{†}
^{*} Sales figures based on certification alone.^{^} Shipments figures based on certification alone.^{‡} Sales+streaming figures based on certification alone.^{†} Streaming-only figures based on certification alone.

== Release history ==
Release dates and formats
Region	Date	Version(s)	Format(s)	Label(s)	Ref.
United States	August 31, 2007	"Gimme More"	Streaming	Jive	
France	September 1, 2007	"Gimme More"	Contemporary hit radio	Universal Music	
United States	September 18, 2007	"Gimme More"	Contemporary hit radio	Jive	
United States	September 18, 2007	"Gimme More"	Rhythmic contemporary radio	Jive	
Luxembourg	September 24, 2007	"Gimme More"	Digital download	Sony BMG	
Australia	October 6, 2007	"Gimme More"	Digital download	Sony BMG	
United States	October 12, 2007	"Gimme More"	Digital download (EP)	Jive	
Norway	October 13, 2007	"Gimme More"	Digital download (EP)	Sony BMG	
United Kingdom	October 15, 2007	"Gimme More"	Digital download	RCA	
United Kingdom	October 22, 2007	"Gimme More"	CD	RCA	
Austria	October 25, 2007	"Gimme More"	Digital download (EP)	Sony BMG	
Germany	October 26, 2007	"Gimme More"	Digital download	Sony BMG	
Finland	October 29, 2007	"Gimme More"	Digital download	Sony BMG	
France	October 29, 2007	"Gimme More"	CD	Sony BMG	
Germany	October 29, 2007	"Gimme More"	CD; maxi CD	Sony BMG	
Ireland	October 29, 2007	"Gimme More"	Digital download	Sony BMG	
Spain	October 29, 2007	"Gimme More"	Digital download	Sony BMG	
Sweden	October 31, 2007	"Gimme More"	Digital download	Sony BMG	
New Zealand	November 20, 2007	"Gimme More"	Digital download (EP)	Sony BMG	
Luxembourg	December 1, 2007	"Gimme More"	Digital download (EP)	Sony BMG	
Other countries	January 8, 2008	"Gimme More"	Digital download	Jive	

== See also ==
- List of number-one dance singles of 2007 (U.S.)
