= Into the Night World =

Studio album by Machinae Supremacy
- Released: 16 December 2016
- Recorded: 2016
- Genres: Power metal, alternative metal, chiptune
- Length: 39:50

Machinae Supremacy chronology
Phantom Shadow (2014)	Into the Night World (2016)	Machinae Supremacy (2026)

Into the Night World is the seventh album by the Swedish metal band Machinae Supremacy, which was released on 16 December 2016.

The penultimate track "SID Metal Legacy" is a remix of a short instrumental song originally recorded for a YouTube video celebrating the band's 15-year anniversary. The last track, "The Last March of the Undead", is the fifth and final part of the "March of the Undead" series of songs that originally started back in Robert Stjärnström's former project, Masugn.

== Track listing ==
1. "My Dragons Will Decimate" – 3:46
2. "Into the Night World" – 3:21
3. "Twe27ySeven" – 4:16
4. "Remember Me" – 5:40
5. "Space Boat" – 3:32
6. "Stars Had to Die So That You Could Live" – 3:32
7. "Beast Engine" – 4:50
8. "Dream Sequence" – 3:25
9. "SID Metal Legacy" (instrumental) – 2:38
10. "The Last March of the Undead" – 4:50

== Personnel ==
- Robert Stjärnström – vocals
- Jonas Rörling – guitar, backing vocals
- Tomi Luoma – guitar
- Andreas Gerdin – bass, keyboards, backing vocals
- Niklas "Nicky" Karvonen – drums

=== Additional personnel ===
- Henkka Niemistö – mastering
- Ingeborg Ekeland – guest vocals
- Bjarte Sebastian Hansen, George Lever, Chris Cook – sound engineers
- Cover artwork created by Tithi Luadthong and edited by Robert Stjärnström.
