= Redeemer (Machinae Supremacy album) =

Studio album by Machinae Supremacy
- Released: 28 March 2006
- Recorded: 2005
- Genre: Power metal, chiptune
- Length: 65:46
- Label: Hubnester/Spinefarm

Machinae Supremacy chronology
Deus Ex Machinae (2004)	Redeemer (2006)	Overworld (2008)

Underground edition
- Underground Edition cover

Redeemer is the second studio album by Swedish metal band Machinae Supremacy, released on 28 March 2006. Originally planned for release by Music by Design Records in 2005, it was delayed when the label ceased to exist.

On 6 February 2006, to celebrate the release of the new website, two new tracks from the album were made available for download: "Rise" and "Through the Looking Glass"."Rise" is actually "Lava Bubble Trouble" from the Jets'n'Guns soundtrack, reworked into a full song. The band would later repeat this by converting "Flight of the Toyota" (from the same soundtrack) into the album-track "SID Icarus" within their next album.

== Track listing ==
There are two versions of Redeemer, the underground edition (RUE) and the retail edition (RRE).

The album was recorded in Blind Dog Studios and Hubnester Industries, Luleå. All songs were written and performed by Machinae Supremacy.

=== Underground edition ===
Released 28 March 2006.

1. "Elite" – 4:24
2. "Rise" – 5:32
3. "Fury" – 5:06
4. "Ronin" – 4:17
5. "Kaori Stomp" – 4:17
6. "Hate" – 4:12
7. "I Know the Reaper" – 4:35
8. "Seventeen" – 3:45
9. "The Cavern of Lost Time" – 0:34
10. "Rogue World Asylum" – 4:13
11. "Through the Looking Glass" – 5:10
12. "Oki Kuma's Adventure" – 5:12 (Japanese for to Big Bear's [Adventure])
13. "Reanimator (March of the Undead III)" – 5:00
14. "Prelude to Empire" – 1:37
15. "Empire" – 6:51

=== Retail edition ===
The major label edition of the album is trimmed and remixed. It was released on 8 November 2006 by Spinefarm Records. This version included an additional track, Ghost (Beneath the Surface), which was originally released as a site release.

1. "Elite" – 4:23
2. "Through the Looking Glass" – 5:07
3. "Rogue World Asylum" – 4:10
4. "Rise" – 5:30
5. "I Know the Reaper" – 4:34
6. "Hate" – 4:13
7. "Ghost (Beneath the Surface)" – 5:11
8. "Seventeen" – 3:42
9. "Ronin" – 5:13
10. "Oki Kuma's Adventure" – 5:23
11. "Reanimator (March of the Undead III)" – 5:02

== Reception ==
Professional ratings
Review scores
Source	Rating
Kerrang!	4/5 stars
Metal Hammer UK	8/10 stars

Redeemer received mostly positive reviews, Matthias Mineur saying "Unaware of the tight rules that govern more 'scene' oriented nations, [Machinae Supremacy] have invented something magnificent: power rock." Some reviews have described the sound as almost "pop" like, while still remaining heavy, Nick Russel suggesting the album is "Pop music for metalheads?" and John A. Hanson using the term "power-pop" to describe the sound.

One criticism is Stjärnström's vocals, with one reviewer describing them as "admittedly one of the whinier vocalists I've heard in quite a while," but he then adds that it "manages to be epic all the same."

== Personnel ==
- Robert Stjärnström – vocals, guitar, art and design
- Jonas Rörling – guitar, backing vocals
- Johan Palovaara – bass (While Palovaara is credited, he did not record any bass for the album.)
- Andreas Gerdin – keyboards, backing vocals
- Tomas Nilsén – drums

Additional personnel

- Fredrik Nordström – mixing
- Patrik J – mixing
- Thomas Eberger – mastering
- Erica Öberg of Inja – additional vocals
- Chicka Kowahira – additional vocals
- Kahl Hellmer – bass
