= Rise of a Digital Nation =

Studio album by Machinae Supremacy
- Released: 19 October 2012
- Recorded: 2012
- Genre: Power metal, alternative metal, chiptune
- Length: 42:13
- Label: Spinefarm Records

Machinae Supremacy chronology
A View from the End of the World (2010)	Rise of a Digital Nation (2012)	Phantom Shadow (2014)

Rise of a Digital Nation is the fifth album by Swedish metal band Machinae Supremacy, released on 19 October 2012. It was featured on the controversial Swedish file-sharing site The Pirate Bay from 23 November 2012 to 25 November. This was decided by voters through Facebook. It was featured as a banner on the main site leading to the Rise of a Digital Nation website when clicked.

A music video was made for the song "All of My Angels" in 2013 to commemorate the 50th anniversary of Doctor Who.

Jonas Rörling performs lead vocals during the verses of "Laser Speed Force".

== Track listing ==
Official track listing released by the band:

1. "All of My Angels" – 4:54
2. "Laser Speed Force" – 4:07
3. "Transgenic" – 4:09
4. "Rise of a Digital Nation" – 4:07
5. "Pieces" – 4:16
6. "Cyber Warfare" (instrumental) – 1:26
7. "Republic of Gamers" – 4:14
8. "Battlecry" – 4:16
9. "99" – 5:26
10. "Hero" – 5:24
