= Machinae Supremacy =

Swedish metal band

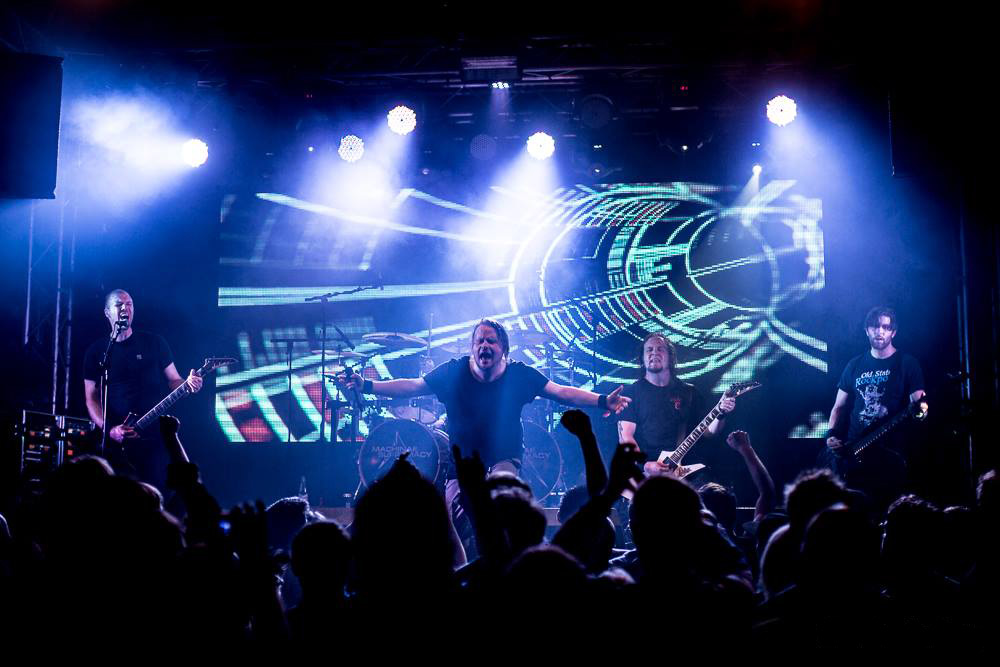
- Machinae Supremacy live at Sticky Fingers in Gothenburg, Sweden

Background information
- Origin: Luleå, Sweden
- Genres: Power metal; alternative metal; chiptune
- Years active: 2000–present
- Labels: Hubnester Records, Spinefarm (formerly)
- Members: Robert Stjärnström; Jonas Rörling; Andreas Gerdin; Niklas Karvonen; Tomi Luoma
- Past members: Kahl Hellmer; Johan Palovaara; Tobias Malm; Tomas Nilsén; Johan Hedlund
- Website: machinaesupremacy.com

Machinae Supremacy is a Swedish/Finnish band that combines modern heavy metal, power metal and alternative rock with chiptunes. Self-defined as "SID metal", many of their songs use a SidStation that features the SID chip of the Commodore 64. They have released 32 original recordings for free download on their site, with approximately 100,000 downloads a month.

Deus Ex Machinae, the band's first commercial album was released in 2004 through the independent (and now defunct) MbD Records UK. The band released their second studio album, Redeemer, in 2006, and a new studio album every other year until 2016 which saw the release of Into the Night World. In March 2026 the band released their self-titled album independently.

== History ==
=== Origin: 2000–2001 ===
Machinae Supremacy was formed in Luleå, Sweden during the summer of 2000 by Robert Stjärnström, Kahl Hellmer and Jonas Rörling. The name of the band had existed before this, but it was only a few months later the band decided on a specific style they wanted to pursue. Andreas Gerdin, a long-time friend of Rörling, joined on keyboards and Tobias Malm joined on drums. Together they recorded their first song, "Cryosleep."

Defining an original style and being fans of the Commodore 64, they settled on using the SID chip from the machine in their music, later becoming known by the term "SID metal". They described their music as carrying a vibe of self-confidence, enlightenment and encouragement for people to take control of their own lives.

=== Promo: 2001–2003 ===
"The Great Gianna Sisters"
Machinae Supremacy's version of the Great Gianna Sisters theme

The band saw the Internet as the best way to reach a wider audience, forgoing the traditional method of sending demos to record labels. In 2001 their official website was launched, boasting around nine freely available songs. They distributed their music through the free Vorbis audio codec as well as MP3.

The band attempted to reach out to the Commodore 64 community in an attempt to gain a larger fan base. It was during this time "The Great Gianna Sisters" was released, a cover of the theme to Great Giana Sisters composed by Chris Hülsbeck. Releasing this song onto various Commodore 64 remix sites proved to be instrumental in the band's early success, which was later increased by the follow-up, the Sidology series. Machinae Supremacy would go on to perform their first show abroad, at a nightclub in Soho during the Back in Time Live event.

During 2001, Stjärnström and Hellmer, together with friend Tomi Tauriainen formed the short-lived punk rock side-project, FLAK. Intending to express a political side, only three songs were released; parts of which would later go on to influence Machinae Supremacy songs. From an interview with Stjärnström "FLAK is... aggression and pain! :] It's a band, but it's nothing serious, just a means of expression."

In 2002, Tobias Malm left the band and was replaced by Tomas Nilsén, who is a long-time friend (and previous bandmate in Garden of Concrete) of Stjärnström's. Over the next few years, they released 25 freely downloadable songs before they began work on their first studio album.

=== Deus Ex Machinae: 2004–2005 ===
Ghost (Beneath The Surface) excerpt
Excerpt of Machinae Supremacy "Ghost (Beneath The Surface)"

In May 2004, the band announced the release of their first commercial album Deus Ex Machinae through Music By Design Records Ltd. (MbD). The album's first print of 1000 copies sold out within a year, leading to a second print being released in 2005. Shortly after the release of reprint of Deus Ex Machinae, MbD ceased trading and the band were without a record label for the then-in-development second album. This album would not be released until 2006.

The band contributed to other projects that year; they worked on the soundtrack for the video game Jets'n'Guns by RakeInGrass software. The Jets'n'Guns Soundtrack was released for free in December 2004. In that year three of their songs were included in the In the Groove series of dancing games; "Hybrid", "Bouff" and "Cryosleep".

During 2005, the band's focus was directed towards finishing and finding a way to release their second album. "Ghost (Beneath The Surface)" was released, as an outtake from the album.. They collaborated with the German gaming magazine GameStar to produce and release two songs, "Loot Burn Rape Kill Repeat" on 25 June for a World of Warcraft special, and "Multiball" (a medley of themes from the Pinball Dreams series) on 20 November for a Battlefield 2 special.

Later that year, Hellmer moved away from Luleå and could no longer take part in the band. He was replaced by Johan Palovaara.

=== Redeemer: 2006–2007 ===
Early in 2006, on 9 January, the band was able to release "Sidology Episode II – Trinity", finally completing their "Sidology" series, as well as announce a sister production company Hubnester Industries, which would handle future soundtrack and commissioned work.

On 18 March of that year they were able to independently release their second commercial album, Redeemer through their own merchandise web site and store using Hubnester Industries as their own record label. Then on 27 September that year it was announced they had signed to Spinefarm Records in a 4 album record deal and would remaster and re-release Redeemer to retail on 8 November.

In late 2006 the band, with Hubnester Industries, worked on the soundtrack to the now postponed PC game War Angels, developed by Moonpod, and their third studio album. On 27 November 2006, the band's lineup was changed with the hope of improving the quality of live performances, with Stjärnström's guitar role passing on to Gerdin, allowing Stjärnström to focus solely on vocals, and replacing the keyboard with pre-recorded samples.

In 2007, it was confirmed that the band would produce their first music video for the song "Through The Looking Glass". It was directed by Tomi Tauriainen, and shot by Torbjörn Lindbäck and was released after several delays later that year.

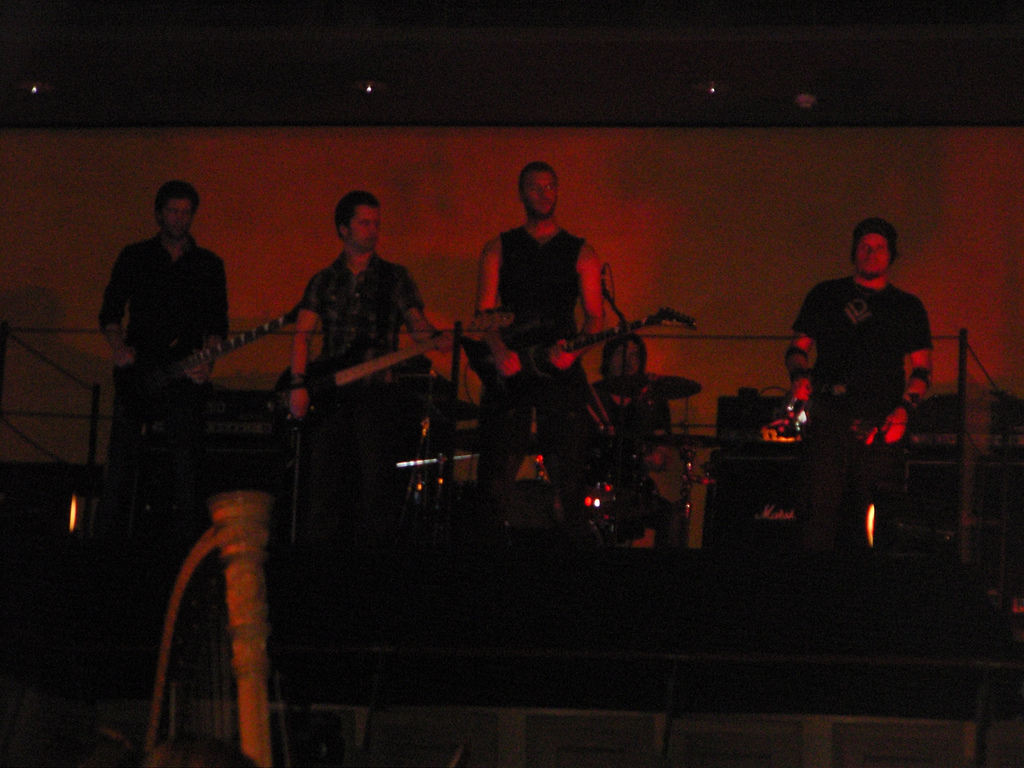
Performing at Play! A Video Game Symphony in Stockholm

It was during this year that the band were asked to perform with the Royal Stockholm Philharmonic Orchestra during the Play! A Video Game Symphony concert in Stockholm, part of the world-tour event featuring music from video games. They played during the song "Dancing Mad" from Final Fantasy VI. Following the success of this concert, they were asked to return to the event in Oslo, Norway with the Norwegian Radio Orchestra and the Oslo Philharmonic Choir where they played, among other songs, Metallica's "One" during a Guitar Hero segment.

=== Overworld: 2007–2009 ===
On 9 October, shortly after the band released their first music video for the song "Through the Looking Glass", it was announced that Johan Palovaara was leaving the band, "Due to different priorities, Johan Palovaara is now leaving the band to pursue other ambitions." It was later revealed it was over the band's decision to perform at events such as Play!. Johan Hedlund was hired as the band's new bassist.

Production began on the third album, Overworld during 2007. The first radio single from the new album, a cover of Britney Spears' "Gimme More", was premiered on the Finnish station YleX in late November.

The album was released on 13 February 2008. Later in the year after a web site redesign the Vorbis audio files were replaced with lossless FLAC files. In October the band released a cover of the title theme from the 1988 video game Bionic Commando for the game's sequel.

In August 2009, Nilsén departed the band due to "personal issues". He was replaced by Niklas Karvonen in October 2009.

=== A View from the End of the World: 2010–2011 ===
The band released their fourth studio album, A View from the End of the World, on 3 November 2010. The video for the song "Force Feedback" was later released in 2011.

In early 2011 the band toured Europe supporting Children of Bodom on their Ugly World Tour. A UK-only best of compilation, The Beat of Our Decay, was released on 28 March 2011 to support the tour. After four years of membership, Hedlund left the band on 19 June 2011; Gerdin switched to bass to fill his spot and Stjärstrom returned to performing his role as the band's rhythm guitarist. The band did not release an official statement regarding his reasons.

=== Rise of a Digital Nation: 2012–2013 ===
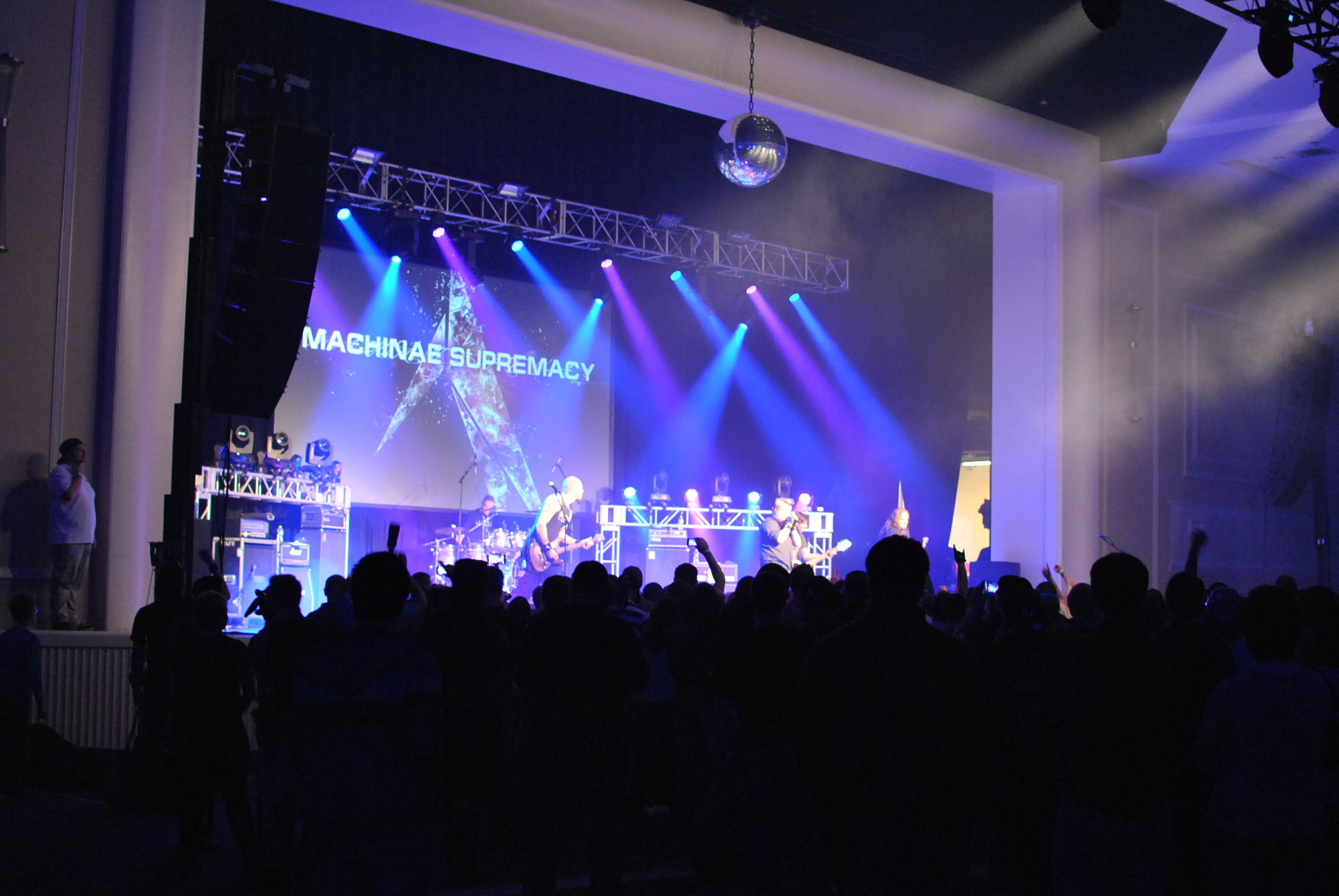
Machinae Supremacy performing at MAGFest 13 in January 2015

The fifth studio album of Machinae Supremacy, Rise of a Digital Nation, was released on 19 October 2012. It was featured on the controversial Swedish file-sharing website The Pirate Bay, leading to a significant increase in the band's online profile.

Robert Stjärnström and Jonas Rörling composed an intro theme to the 2012 video game Cortex Command. The band also worked on the soundtrack of the 2012 game Giana Sisters: Twisted Dreams.

On 5 December 2012, Machinae Supremacy announced on their official Facebook page that Tomi Luoma would be joining the band as their rhythm guitarist, first appearing with them on 10 January 2013.

A music video was made for the album's opening track "All of My Angels" to commemorate the 50th anniversary of Doctor Who.

In 2013, Machinae Supremacy announced that they were working on a new album, due for release in 2014, and launched a fundraiser through their own website for a headlining European tour. The fundraiser, which deadline was extended several times, lasted from 22 September 2013 to 12 January 2014, collecting over €37000 from more than 350 single donations. As a result, twelve different European countries were "unlocked", in which a tour is planned to take place during 2014.

On 4 January 2014, Machinae Supremacy played their first show in the United States at MAGFest 12, a Music and Gaming Festival in Washington, DC.

=== Phantom Shadow: 2014–2015 ===
On 14 March 2014, Robert Stjärnström announced that the "release [of the new album] won't be until August." The new album, titled Phantom Shadow, was released on 22 August 2014.

On 9 September 2015, Machinae Supremacy announced on their Facebook page that they would have to cancel shows on the rest of their tour in Germany and the UK. Stating that "On the morning of September 5th our bus driver Stefan, Gordon's [Gerdin] father, suffered a stroke while driving between Turku to Tampere, Finland". Whilst no one was hurt in the highway collision, the driver was rushed to hospital, and they played three further shows before announcing that the rest of the tour would not go ahead.

=== Into the Night World: 2016–2021 ===
The seventh studio album of Machinae Supremacy, Into the Night World, was released on 16 December 2016 independently on the band's own label, Hubnester Records.

=== Singles and Machinae Supremacy: 2021–present ===
In 2021, the band released the singles "Empire of Steel" (a cover of the same song by Essenger), "Pendulum", and "We Are The Ones Who Will Change The World". Later, in 2023 they also released the song "Warriors, Pt. 1 (Final Stage)".

On 1 December 2025, Machinae Supremacy announced their eight studio album, the self-titled Machinae Supremacy. It was released on 6 March 2026 and featured several of the tracks previously released as singles along with new material.

== Members ==
Current members

- Robert "Gaz" Stjärnström – lead vocals (2000–present), rhythm guitar (2000–2006, 2011–2013)
- Jonas "Gibli" Rörling – lead guitar, backing vocals (2000–present)
- Andreas "Gordon" Gerdin – keyboards, backing vocals (2000–present, studio only since 2006), rhythm guitar (2006–2011), bass (2011–present)
- Niklas "Nicky" Karvonen – drums (2009–present)
- Tomi Luoma – rhythm guitar (2013–present)

Former members

- Kahl Hellmer – bass (2000–2005)
- Johan "Poe" Palovaara – bass (2005–2007)
- Tobias "Tobbe" Malm – drums (2000–2002)
- Tomas "Tom" Nilsén – drums (2002–2009)
- Johan "Dezo" Hedlund – bass (2007–2011)

== Discography ==
=== Studio albums ===
Year	Title	Release date	Label
2002	Origin	2002	Independent/internet release
2002	Arcade	2002	Independent/internet release
2004	Fury	2004	Independent/internet release
2004	Deus Ex Machinae	1 May 2004	MbD Records UK/Hubnester Industries (reprint)
2004	Jets'n'Guns Soundtrack	4 December 2004	Independent/internet release
2006	Redeemer	18 March 2006	Hubnester Industries/Spinefarm Records
2008	Overworld	13 February 2008	Spinefarm Records
2010	A View from the End of the World	3 November 2010	Spinefarm Records
2012	Rise of a Digital Nation	19 October 2012	Spinefarm Records
2014	Phantom Shadow	22 August 2014	Spinefarm Records
2016	Into the Night World	16 December 2016	Hubnester Records (Independent/internet release)
2020	Jets'n'Guns 2 Soundtrack	24 July 2020	Independent/internet release
2026	Machinae Supremacy	6 March 2026	Hubnester Records (Independent/internet release)

"Origin", "Arcade", and "Fury" are actually compilations of webography tracks originally released via website. "Jets'n'Guns Soundtrack" is the soundtrack album for the video game Jets'n'Guns.

=== Compilations and live albums ===
Title	Release date	Notes	Label
CrapPack	2004	Collection of unreleased tracks	Independent/internet release
Live in Lappfejden	2004	Live recording	Independent/internet release
The Beat of Our Decay	4 April 2011	UK best of compilation	Spinefarm UK
Live at Assembly Summer 2011	14 October 2011	Video album	Independent/Internet release

=== Webography ===
Promotional tracks are released as free downloads on the band's website. These tracks have been compiled into 3 albums; Origin, Arcade, and Fury. Songs listed by year originally released.

2000

- "Cryosleep" – 5:49

2001

- "Anthem Apocalyptica" – 3:25
- "Arcade" – 5:50
- "Fighters from Ninne" – 3:05
- "Follower" – 3:18
- "The Great Gianna Sisters" – 4:34
- "Hero" – 4:26
- "I Turn to You" – 5:19
- "March of the Undead Part II" – 4:30
- "Missing Link" – 4:34
- "Origin" – 4:39
- "Sidstyler" – 3:15
- "The Wired" – 4:42
- "Timeline" – 4:37

2002

- "Attack Music" – 3:45
- "Earthbound" – 4:50
- "Hubnester Inferno" – 4:15
- "Hybrid" – 3:56
- "Kings of the Scene" – 3:29
- "Masquerade" – 4:54
- "Nemesis" – 4:57
- "Sidology 1 – Sid Evolution" – 5:48
- "Sidology 3 – Apex Ultima" – 7:00
- "Winterstorm" – 3:59

2003

- "Bouff" – 3:16

2004

- "Legion of Stoopid" – 4:52
- "Soundtrack to the Rebellion" – 5:56

2005

- "Ghost (Beneath the Surface)" – 5:15
- "Loot Burn Rape Kill Repeat" – 2:41
- "Multiball" – 6:45
- "Steve's Quest" – 3:21

2006

- "Sidology 2 – Trinity" – 12:50

2007

- "Fury 2007" – 5:10

2008

- "Bionic Commando" – 1:57

2016

- "Gerudo Valley (from Ocarina of Time)" – 2:35

2021

- "Empire of Steel (Essenger cover)" – 3:37
