= Giana Sisters DS =

2009 video game

- Cover art
- Developers: Spellbound Entertainment; Bitfield GmbH; Kaasa Solution (Ouya, PC, Android)
- Publishers: EU: DTP Entertainment; NA: Destineer; WW: Bad Monkee (iOS, OS X); WW: Kaasa Solution (Ouya, Android); WW: Black Forest Games (PC)
- Producers: Armin Gessert; Steffen Ruehl; Andreas Speer
- Designers: Severin Brettmeister; Jean-Marc Haessig; Christian Wild; Alex Pierschel
- Programmers: David Salz; Daniel Matzke
- Artists: Christian Wild; Marcus Koch; Alex Pierschel
- Composer: Fabian Del Priore
- Platforms: Nintendo DS, iOS, Mac OS X, Apple TV, Android, Ouya, Microsoft Windows
- Release: April 3, 2009: DS; EU: April 3, 2009; AU: August 16, 2009; NA: February 22, 2011 iOS February 9, 2010 OS X October 17, 2011 Android November 23, 2011 Ouya June 28, 2013 Windows October 23, 2015
- Genre: Platform
- Mode: Single-player

Giana Sisters DS, also known on other handheld platforms as Giana Sisters, is a platform game developed by Spellbound Entertainment in cooperation with Bitfield GmbH for the Nintendo DS, iPad, iPhone, and Android. It was published by DTP Entertainment in Europe and Destineer in North America. It is a spiritual sequel to the 1987 Commodore 64 release The Great Giana Sisters. A version for Microsoft Windows, re-titled Giana Sisters 2D, was also released.

== Gameplay ==
Giana Sisters contains over 80 levels to be explored for hitting blocks, collecting crystals, finding secrets and eventually complete the stage. Despite having the same retro jump'n'run gameplay, the game distances itself from the 1987 game and its plagiarism of Super Mario Bros., it has all new touch screen and microphone abilities allowing the Giana sisters to make use of various power-ups to aid their adventure. A world map allows for stages to be replayed after completion. It also contains a remake of all of the levels from The Great Giana Sisters as an unlockable.

The biggest drawback for Giana Sisters DS is the lack of multiplayer support, and the original sister, "Maria", doesn't appear in the game. The name "Giana Sisters" may refer to the actual forms of Giana's character (cute or punk).

=== Levels ===
The game is separated into 8 worlds, and all of them have 9 normal stages and 1 bonus stage. These worlds don't have a distinctive style, except for world 8, which contains volcanic (infernal) stages combined with mazelike castles. World 3, 6 and 7 are more wintery in their style, while world 4 takes place on small islands. Bonus stages are unlockable levels with a heavenly style, except for the world 8 bonus, which is a remake of the original Commodore 64 game. Updated versions of these original levels are scattered through world 1 to world 5 as well. The brand-new stages are more complex in their level design, as all of them have exploration and occasional right-to-left and vertical progression as well. World 6 is generally considered as the point where the more serious adventure starts. At the end of the stages a flag awaits which is either blue or red, depending on the collected red crystals. The stages have various settings: overworld, rainy overworld, mountain/winter, cave, castle (the majority of the boss stages are castles), volcanic/infernal (found in world 8) and heaven (bonus stages). Levels also include time a limit and various checkpoints in them. The checkpoint is a potted flower, while the timer is always set to 300, except for the infernal levels, where it is set to 666. There are secret levels as well in the game. Some of them can be reached by hitting hidden blocks, like in the original Commodore 64 game, while others can be reached only after completing the regular game.

== Plot ==
Giana is a young girl who fell asleep one evening while admiring her precious treasure chest. As she fell into a deep sleep, magical powers emerged from the treasure chest, bathing Giana's bedroom in a brilliantly bright light. Vibrating with mystical energy, the treasure chest fell off the bed with a crash. The lid flew open. Giana's sparkling blue diamonds spilled out of the treasure chest and disappeared into a deep, black hole.

Giana, awakened by the light (and the noise), leaped off the bed and followed her prized diamonds into the darkness. She suddenly found herself in a magical world. Giana's diamonds were scattered all about her. She started to collect her diamonds and then decided to find out more about the secret of her magic treasure chest.

== Development ==
The game marked the return of Armin Gessert to the Giana Sisters series that he created in 1987. It was developed by German-based developer Spellbound Entertainment. The graphics and artwork were provided by German illustration artist Alex "Pikomi" Pierschel. The music is based on Chris Hülsbeck's compositions from the original 1987 game, arranged by Fabian Del Priore. The game's executive producer was Armin Gessert, the man behind the programming of The Great Giana Sisters. Manfred Trenz and Chris Hülsbeck got an additional thanks in the game credits as well.

== Release ==
The game was released in Europe by DTP Entertainment in April 2009. Later that year, it saw a release in Australia as well. In February 2011, the game was made available in North America by publisher Destineer through online outlets such as Newegg and Walmart.

It was ported to iPhone in February 2010, iPad in July and Android devices in November 2011. The iOS and Android versions feature new touch controls and HD resolution graphics. The port was published by Bad Monkee. The HD version was part of the Ouya launch lineup in 2013. The HD version was also released on OS X in October 2011 and Windows in October 2015.

Armin Gessert died only a few months after the release of the game.

== Reception ==
Reception

Aggregate scores
| Aggregator | Score |
|---|---|
| GameRankings | DS: 78% |
| Metacritic | iOS: 85/100 |

Review scores
| Publication | Score |
|---|---|
| Destructoid | 5.0/10 |
| Nintendo Life | 9/10 |
| Nintendo Power | 9.0/10 |
| TouchArcade | iOS: 4/5 |
| 4Players | 76/100 |

Award
| Publication | Award |
|---|---|
| German Game Developer Award 2009 | Best Children's Game |

Giana Sisters DS was met with positive response, citing good controls and catchy music. The biggest credits were given to Pikomi's standout animation and artwork, but the game was criticized for being too easy for seasoned players, and somewhat unoriginal too. The lack of multiplayer and the removal of some old-school power-ups were also criticised, although the bubble gum and the soda power-ups were met with a positive response.

The iOS port was ranked the most downloaded game app during its month of release in Germany, Austria, Netherlands and Norway.

== Sequel ==
In 2012, Black Forest Games developed a new installment of The Great Giana Sisters tentatively titled Project Giana stating that the "Project Giana is the grandchild of The Great Giana Sisters". The game features music from The Great Giana Sister's original composer Chris Huelsbeck and the Swedish "SID metal" band Machinae Supremacy. It was released on October 23 for PC with later releases on Xbox Live Arcade, PlayStation Network, Nintendo eShop, and possibly Ouya.
