= Giana Sisters: Twisted Dreams =

2012 video game

- Developer: Black Forest Games
- Publisher: Black Forest Games (Note: Later ports and re-releases were published by THQ Nordic while the Nintendo Switch version published by HandyGames.)
- Director: Jean-Marc Haessig
- Producer: Vladimir Ignatov
- Designers: Sarah Grümmer; Rolf Beismann; Simon Chapuis; David Sallmann; Stefan Schmitz
- Programmers: David Paris; Florian Ross; Manuel Umbach
- Artists: Joel Belin; Serge Mandon; Andreas Feist
- Composers: Chris Huelsbeck; Machinae Supremacy; Fabian Del Priore
- Engine: Havok Vision
- Platforms: Windows; PlayStation 3; PlayStation 4; Xbox 360; Xbox One; Wii U; Nintendo Switch
- Release: Windows: WW: October 23, 2012; Xbox 360 (XBLA): WW: March 20, 2013; PlayStation 3 (PSN): WW: June 18, 2013; Wii U (eShop): PAL: August 22, 2013; NA: September 5, 2013; JP: March 18, 2015; PlayStation 4: WW: December 9, 2014; Xbox One: WW: December 12, 2014; Nintendo Switch: WW: September 25, 2018
- Genre: Puzzle-platformer
- Mode: Single-player

Giana Sisters: Twisted Dreams is a 2012 platform game developed and published by Black Forest Games for Windows. It is the sequel to the 2009 Nintendo DS game Giana Sisters DS, itself a remake of the 1987 Commodore 64 game The Great Giana Sisters. The game was funded through crowdfunding website Kickstarter, reaching its goal of $150,000.

The game was ported to Xbox 360, PlayStation 3, and Wii U in 2013, and PlayStation 4 and Xbox One in 2014. HandyGames, a THQ Nordic subsidiary, released the game on Nintendo Switch in 2018.

== Plot ==
Maria is abducted to the Dream World, where the wicked dragon Gurglewocky holds her prisoner. It is up to her sister, Giana, who has become a teenager in the time since the last entry in the series, to enter the Dream World and rescue her. Because she is in a stage of her life that is all about transformation, she has learned how to manipulate her dreams. She must use this newly-developed ability to jump between dreams and transform herself into a "Cute" and "Punk" persona in order to deal with her inner conflict and fear while she searches for her sister. As in the past, Giana can pick up crystals for points and discover secrets.

== Development ==
After the development of Giana Sisters DS in 2009, Spellbound Entertainment went bankrupt and Armin Gessert died. Soon after the dissolution of the company, Black Forest Games was founded by the key members and management from Spellbound. The newly-established game developer decided to move on their own and took over all Spellbound assets, including the intellectual property. In total, 40 of the former Spellbound team of 65 members followed and became part of Black Forest Games. While Black Forest Games was formed to develop action role-playing and strategy games for Windows, PlayStation 3 and Xbox 360, their foremost desire was to develop an all-new Giana Sisters game.

Beginning production in early 2011, Black Forest Games was initially shopping the game around to various publishers, the conditions put on the developer in order for the game to see a release was deemed unfavorable, and required a lot of content to be cut. The newly-assembled team was eager to break away from the public perception that the franchise is only known as a copycat of Super Mario Bros., and sought to change it by creating a unique modern platforming game with high production values and original game mechanics. One of the most important aspects of the very first Giana Sisters was the ability to transform into a "punk" variation by picking up the ball item, and this became the basis for Project Giana.

"Punk Giana" using her dash attack in Giana Sisters: Twisted Dreams

Building on the concept of Giana's own transformation, the team began to draw a concept for Giana to have the ability to change the world around her in addition to herself, and several prototypes were made to test the trans-morphing of the environment, enemies and Giana's own abilities. The concept was deemed a success, and Black Forest Games began to focus the game to make use of a seamless transformation system which is controlled by the player itself. The engine was built up entirely in-house in order to provide a seamless player-controlled switch affecting the entire landscape, as well as the in-game audio which has two distinctly different sounds depending on which dream world is being played.

Giana herself was given two personas, a "cute" Giana and "punk" Giana. Cute Giana has the ability to twirl and glide through the air in order to travel great distances and avoid danger, signifying her composure and grace. Cute Giana inhabits the Nightmare world. Punk Giana can go make use of an aggressive dash attack which enables her to attack enemies and bounce off them or walls to reach new locations. Giana's punk persona inhabits the regular dream world. At any time, the player can switch between the two personas to make use of their abilities, which in turn will also switch the dream layout accordingly.

While the Nintendo DS game used a stylized art design based on the artwork of the German illustration artist Alex "Pikomi" Pierschel, a strictly 2D-based game was deemed unfavorable with the switch mechanic, and therefore required a more modern, 3D modeled design. The game plays on a 2D plane with 3D models and objects.

Despite being relatively far into development, the company contemplated shelving the game indefinitely in order to fund the game themselves through assembled profit from other future game releases. However, due to the success of Kickstarter in the spring of 2012, the company decided to revive the project and assist development by crowdfunding, setting the goal amount at $150,000. The Kickstarter campaign was launched on July 30, 2012.

Along with the fundraiser, eventual XBLA and PSN support was announced. The game's stretch goals mentioned that Project Giana would see a basic 16-level release at $150,000, and a full version 20-level release at $200,000. In the event of the fundraiser going beyond the set goal, OUYA support was also mentioned at $300,000.

A playable demo was offered to the press on August 20. The demo contained a playable level showcasing the game's unique features. A public demo followed shortly after and was released on the Kickstarter page.

The fundraiser reached its goal on August 29, 3 days prior to its last day. It amassed a total of $186,159 on the official Kickstarter site, and reached $190,000 when the PayPal pledges were added in. A livestream was held to celebrate the success, broadcasting live from the Black Forest Games offices, featuring interviews with the team itself and also with Chris Hülsbeck via Skype.

On August 30, Project Giana was among the first games featured on Valve's Steam Greenlight program, enabling its community to rate the games they would like to see on the Steam download service. On October 15, it was green-lit for release on Steam. Fans were invited to vote for their preferred title: Twisted Dreams, Giana's Twisted Dream and Project Giana.

=== Music ===
Giana Sisters: Twisted Dreams brings back the composer of the original Great Giana Sisters, Chris Huelsbeck, along with the Swedish heavy metal band Machinae Supremacy and Fabian Del Priore who also worked on Giana Sisters DS.

The music is one of the key features of Giana Sisters: Twisted Dreams, flowing seamlessly between Huelsbeck's original compositions and Del Priore's arrangements into Machinae Supremacy's heavy metal rendition of the soundtrack. This is achieved by having both soundtracks layered and played at the same time, and changing when the switch button is pressed.

A CD soundtrack release was offered as a reward on Project Giana's Kickstarter.

=== Kickstarter ===
The Kickstarter campaign was launched on July 30, 2012. Along with the announcement, a gameplay video was distributed narrated by the company's own mascot. In total, 19 rewards were made available, ranging from the price point of $10 for a downloadable copy of the game to $10,000 for a new copy of the extremely rare Atari ST version of the original 1987 game. Among the rewards were also downloadable digital and physical copies of an artbook by Pikomi based on the Giana Sisters franchise, soundtrack CDs and owl plushies. The Kickstarter campaign reached its set goal on August 29.

== Release ==
Giana Sisters: Twisted Dreams was released in digital form on October 23, 2012 on Steam. DLC content, Giana Sisters: Twisted Dreams – Rise of the Owlverlord, was released on September 26, 2013 for Windows. Those who backed the original Kickstarter campaign were able to download the content for free. Rise of the Owlverlord could also be purchased by itself, as a stand-alone game. Giana Sisters: Twisted Dreams was released for Wii U on September 5 the same year. Mac and Linux support were promised after the release of Humble Indie Bundle 11 in February 2014, but have yet to be released.

A physical Director's Cut was released for PlayStation 4 and Xbox One on December 12, 2014. It included the game along with Giana Sisters: Twisted Dreams – Rise of the Owlverlord. It also came out physically on Wii U on September 8, 2015 in North America only.

Giana Sisters: Twisted Dreams – Owltimate Edition was released for Nintendo Switch on September 25, 2018. It contained the content of the Director's Cut Version and introduced 5 more levels and cutscenes for all levels.

== Reception ==
Reception

Aggregate score
Aggregator	Score
Metacritic	PC: 77/100; X360: 69/100; WIIU: 74/100; PS4: 80/100; NS: 75/100

=== Pre-release ===
Project Giana's press demo was met with a favorable reception from gaming news outlets. John Walker of Rock, Paper, Shotgun remarked that the game "looks absolutely beautiful. It's a puzzle platformer in which you can control not only the main character, but also the mood of the world you're in". Audun Sorlie at Destructoid noted "Project Giana is truly a labor of Euro love", and that "the game seems to be shaping into what could be one of the most unique and original platformers in several years". Dustin Steiner of Gamezone noted that "the controls in particular were very polished leaving gameplay a matter of your personal skill with the engine, unlike some other platformers we've seen in recent years".

=== Critical response ===
Giana Sisters: Twisted Dreams received generally favorable reviews, with a score of 77/100 on Metacritic.
