= Armin Gessert =

German computer game developer (1963 – 2009)

- Born: June 13, 1963
- Died: November 8, 2009 (aged 46)
- Occupation: Computer game programmer
- Years active: 1984-2009

Armin Gessert (June 13, 1963 – November 8, 2009) was a computer game developer from Germany. Along with Manfred Trenz and Chris Hülsbeck, he was one of the developers of the 1987 computer game The Great Giana Sisters for Commodore 64. His previous employers included the labels Rainbow Arts and Blue Byte. He was the founder of Spellbound Entertainment.

== Career ==
Gessert's first title was the action adventure Street Gang, released under Rainbow Arts in 1984. In 1994, he established his own company, Spellbound Entertainment. Spellbound released several titles, including Desperados, Desperados 2, and Airline Tycoon. Gessert's last title, Great Giana Sisters DS, was released in 2009 in Germany and Australia.

== Death ==
Gessert died of a heart attack on November 8, 2009, after 25 years in the video game industry.
