= The Great Giana Sisters =

1987 video game

- German cover art for the Commodore 64
- Developer: Time Warp
- Publisher: Rainbow Arts
- Designers: Armin Gessert; Manfred Trenz
- Composer: Chris Huelsbeck
- Platforms: Amiga, Amstrad CPC, Atari ST, Commodore 64, MSX
- Release: May 6, 1987
- Genre: Platformer
- Modes: Single-player, multiplayer

The Great Giana Sisters (Note: Some versions of the game, such as the MSX release, spell the title The Great Gianna Sisters.) is a platform game developed by the West German company Time Warp and published by Rainbow Arts in 1987 for home computers such as the Commodore 64, Amiga, and Atari ST. Players control Giana (or her sister Maria in the multiplayer mode) to explore a magical world inside their dreams and must find a giant diamond to wake up. They traverse side-scrolling stages while avoiding hazards such as monsters and other enemies. These can be defeated by using power-ups, which grant the player abilities such as firing projectiles and making enemies fall asleep.

The Great Giana Sisters was designed by Armin Gessert and Manfred Trenz. Marc Ulrich of Rainbow Arts told Gessert and Trenz to create a game similar to the popular Nintendo game Super Mario Bros. (1985), but legally distinct. Following its release in West Germany, it was released in the United Kingdom and received praise from publications such as Zzap!64 and Computer and Video Games for its gameplay and secret levels, despite taking significant inspiration from Mario.

Following its UK release, The Great Giana Sisters was pulled from shops after Rainbow Arts received a notice from Nintendo. It eventually became one of the most popular home computer games of its era through piracy and emulation. A sequel for the Commodore 64, Hard'n'Heavy, downplayed its Nintendo inspiration. Various new Giana Sisters games were released in the early 2000s. The game's music, composed by Chris Huelsbeck, was used in later games and performed by symphony orchestras.

== Plot and gameplay ==
The Great Giana Sisters is set in the dream of a girl, Giana. She dreams about a world of deserted castles filled with monsters and can only wake up when she finds a large diamond. It is a platform game, where the player can either control Giana in single-player mode, or switch between Giana and her sister Maria in two-player mode. The player controls either sister via a joystick, where they can walk and jump through 33 levels of horizontally scrolling platforms, while avoiding holes and other dangerous objects such as nails and fire. Each player starts with five lives. Each level has a 100-second time limit. If time runs out, the player loses a life.

Most enemies can be defeated by having Giana jump on top of them. Power-ups granting enhancements can be collected. These include projectiles such as lightning and strawberry power-ups, clocks which cause all enemies onscreen to fall asleep, magic bombs that vanish all enemies on screen, and lollies which give the player an extra life.

== Background and development ==
The Great Giana Sisters was published by Rainbow Arts. Rainbow Arts was founded in 1984 and purchased by the game licensing company Soft-Gold in 1985. The game's developer, Time Warp, was a label for an in-house production team for Rainbow Arts.

In the 1970s and early 1980s, video game clones of popular arcade games were rampant, and this growth of clones was followed on home computers. These clones often copied gameplay and had similar names to their original influences, with games like Munch Man (1982) or Snapper (1982) deriving from Namco's Pac-Man (1980). The trend continued for The Great Giana Sisters. Manfred Trenz and Armin Gessert were assigned to make a game similar to Nintendo's popular Super Mario Bros. after Marc Ulrich, the CEO of publisher Rainbow Arts, saw the game. Trenz recalled that Ulrich grew excited by the potential to be the first to offer a similar game for home computers. In 1983, the Commodore 64 home computer was introduced in West Germany and quickly became the popular home computer in the country. Trenz initially got into computers through a VIC-20 in 1984 and was so impressed that he purchased a Commodore 64 and began developing his own games in BASIC and assembly language. After coming third in a 1986 graphics contest for a German magazine called 64'er, Rainbow Arts was impressed with his entry and asked him to work on graphics for their games. He joined the company on a permanent basis in 1987, and The Great Giana Sisters was his first in-house project.

A level in The Great Giana Sisters. Time Warp were tasked to create a game that was a clone of Nintendo's Super Mario Bros. while being legally distinct from it.

The developers of the game included Trenz, who created the game's visuals and high score programming, Gessert, who developed the rest of the code, and Chris Huelsbeck, who wrote the score. Trenz was not a big fan of Super Mario Bros., having seen the PlayChoice arcade version of the game and Donkey Kong (1981) before, but was "more interested in games like Defender (1981)". Trenz and Gessert received a Nintendo Entertainment System and a copy of Super Mario Bros. and played it intensively to discover the game's secrets. Trenz expressed difficulty with creating the game, stating that it had to be immediately recognizable to players as Super Mario Bros., but legally distinct as to avoid legal issues for Rainbow Arts with Nintendo.

To do so, Trenz changed the mushroom and turtle-like enemies of the original game to owls, disembodied eyes, wasps and giant ants. He recollected that "it would be incredibly cheeky to simply copy the enemies as they were in Super Mario Bros., so I decided to invent as many new and funny ones as possible". He opted to create a style that borrowed the visual sense but had its own design, simpler and shorter than Super Mario Bros., allowing them to make many different levels within their short development time.

Trenz found the Giana sisters' character design difficult, thinking each draft had "something missing". In contrast to Mario, who grows in size when getting a mushroom, the Giana sisters grow spiky hair when collecting a power-up. Trenz's decision was technical, as he thought creating a larger sprite would have been too close to Super Mario Bros. He also commented that he found working with the upper management difficult, who continuously wanted updates on the development of the game. Trenz said the title screen also came under scrutiny, going through a few drafts with the first being deemed "too cute", the second being "far too gloomy" and the third being the final choice for the game. The game took about six to seven months to complete.

Huelsbeck began work with Rainbow Arts by calling them, playing music he had made on his Commodore 64, and asking if they had work for him. The company offered him an in-house position where he produced music for several of the company's games. His music for The Great Giana Sisters features a track for the title screen and two for the main game: one for overworld stages and one for boss stages.

== Release ==
British cover art for The Great Giana Sisters. Developer Manfred Trenz disliked the character design on the cover and felt "The Brothers are History" led to the game's early removal from commercial distribution.

The Great Giana Sisters was released in Europe on May 6, 1987. Versions of the game were released for home computers including the Commodore 64, Amstrad CPC, Atari ST, Amiga and MSX. A version was announced for the ZX Spectrum, but went unreleased. The games were all generally the same across the Atari ST and Amiga as they were for the Commodore 64, with the Atari ST version lacking a scrolling screen.

Soft-Gold founder Jürgen Goeldner said the game was initially available for months and was selling well in Germany. The game was initially set for a July 1988 release in the United Kingdom. It was distributed through U.S. Gold's Go! Media division. Following the British release of the game, Rainbow Arts received what Huelsbeck described as a "nasty letter" from Nintendo, without formal legal action, but including a warning to take the game off the market. Goeldner said the letter from Nintendo went into deep detail on the similarities of the level designs of The Great Giana Sisters and Super Mario Bros.

The British distributor withdrew the game from sale in 1988. Publications such as Your Sinclair in 1988 suggested that Nintendo had taken legal action against the distributor. Trenz later claimed that he was not sure who or what caused the game being pulled from distribution, later suggesting that "placing the slogan 'The Brothers are History!' on the box certainly couldn't have helped". Goeldner echoed the statement about the text on the UK box art, and said that they had reached an out-of-court settlement with Nintendo, which led to them paying the company and removing the game from distribution. Darran Jones wrote in Retro Gamer that the game only grew in popularity after being pulled from store shelves, while Trenz said that the game only received a wider audience after it became commercially unavailable.

Trenz was happy with the German box art for the game but disliked the United Kingdom version, stating it made the characters look strange, and that the Giana sisters resembled Miss Piggy from the Muppets. Jones echoed this, criticizing the Amstrad CPC port of the game as "gruesome art", which featured a title screen resembling the UK cover.

== Reception ==
Reception

Review scores
Publication	Score			
Publication	Amiga	Atari ST	C64	ZX
ACE	713/1000	713/1000	701/1000	
Crash				92%
Computer and Video Games	9/10			
Eurogamer			9/10	
The Games Machine (UK)	78%		82%	
Power Play			8/10	
Sinclair User				55%
ST Action		77%		
Your Sinclair				8/10
Zzap!64			96%	

Darran Jones of Retro Gamer wrote in his overview of the game that The Great Giana Sisters received a "fair amount of critical acclaim" on its release for the Commodore 64. Reviews compared the game to contemporary platformer games. "GBH" of Your Commodore compared the game to earlier attempts at platforming games on home computers, writing that players no longer need "to make pixel perfect leaps or time every move down to the last split second". "Dunc" of Your Sinclair found the game similar to Wonder Boy, stating that The Great Giana Sisters was superior to the game for its addictive gameplay. A Zzap!64 reviewer went as far as to say it was "the best game of its kind since Bubble Bobble, and there can't be many higher recommendations than that". Reviews from several publications including ACE, Power Play, Zzap!64 and Computer and Video Games all compared the game to Super Mario Bros. Matt Bielby of Computer and Video Games went as far as to call it "as straight a rip-off as they come". Reviewers of Zzap!64 and Power Play generally found it not as strong as Nintendo's game.

Other reviews commented on the variety in the gameplay of The Great Giana Sisters, such as "GBH" and the Zzap!64 reviewers who praised the game for its large number of secrets and power-ups. Both of the previous reviews found the game addictive, while Rod Lawton of ACE questioned whether players would feel compelled to complete the game. For the game's music, Lawton wrote that it was "appropriately jaunty", while the reviewers of Zzap!64 found it a "a bit twee", but ultimately excellent.

Jones of Retro Gamer described the version for the Amstrad CPC as a "god-awful conversion" with low-quality graphics and no sound. Crash reviewed the unreleased ZX Spectrum release, praising the variety of the game. It echoed comparisons to Super Mario Bros. stating that The Great Giana Sisters could not compare in terms of graphics to Nintendo's game, but that "in terms of gameplay (which is the most important thing after all), those Super Mario Bros have certainly met their match". The reviewers generally praised the game but found that the ZX Spectrum port lacked colour and ran slower than the Commodore 64 original. Tony Dillion of Sinclair User wrote positively about the game's theme and graphics, but that the game performed far too slowly to be playable on the ZX Spectrum.

From retrospective reviews, Kristan Reed of Eurogamer stated that the game felt like a "footnote in gaming history", saying "to most teenage C64 owners of the late '80s, it was an essential release at the point when the best developers had already started to migrate to the 16-bit systems". In a 2021 overview, Stefano Castelli of IGN called it the best scrolling platform games on the Commodore 64, while still being a pale imitation to Super Mario Bros. He wrote that The Great Giana Sisters was lacking inspired level design in terms of variety, the control lacked the subtleties of Nintendo's game, and that Huelsbeck's music was less inspired than Koji Kondo's Super Mario Bros. score.

== Legacy ==
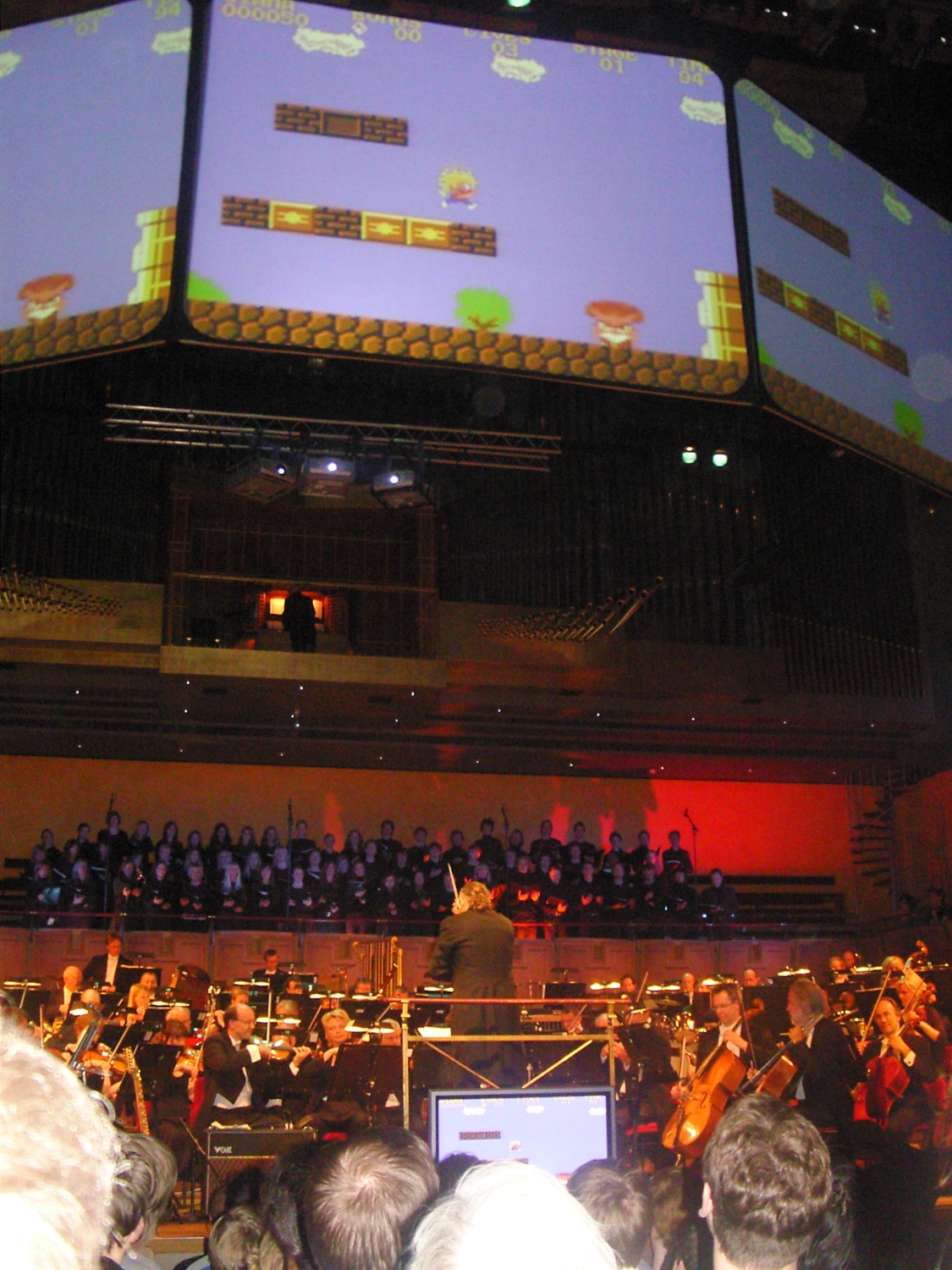
Music from The Great Giana Sisters being performed at Play! A Video Game Symphony in 2007

The Great Giana Sisters received a sequel in 1989, Hard'n'Heavy, for the Commodore 64, Atari ST, and Amiga. The characters in the game wore space suits and had an outer-space themed setting, a theme less connected to Super Mario Bros. By 2008, the rights to the Great Giana Sisters were held by Gessert's Spellbound Entertainment. The company released an adaptation of the C64 version of the game for mobile phones in 2005. Further follow-ups to the game followed in the 21st century, such as Giana Sisters DS (2009), Giana Sisters: Twisted Dreams (2012), and Giana Sisters: Dream Runners (2015).

Andreas Lange and Michael Liebe wrote in Video Games Around the World (2015) that along with Trenz's other Rainbow Arts game Turrican (1989), The Great Giana Sisters was the most popular action game from Germany, with both games receiving international acclaim. Despite being removed from the market, the game grew in popularity via piracy and emulation. Gessert later reflected that "I think it's a great game, but it never reached the detail and class of Super Mario Bros".

Huelsbeck would go on to compose music for games in Star Wars: Rogue Squadron and the R-Type series. His music has been adapted to symphony orchestra music, such as at the concert Symphonic Shades, in tribute to Huelsbeck. Giana Sisters: Twisted Dreams also features Huelsbeck's music, which features new arrangements and extensions from the original music.
