= Best of En Vogue =

Greatest hits album by En Vogue
- Released: June 1, 1999
- Recorded: September 1989–1999
- Genre: R&B; pop; hip-hop; soul
- Label: East West
- Producer: Foster & McElroy

En Vogue chronology
EV3 (1997)	Best of En Vogue (1999)	Masterpiece Theatre (2000)

Singles from Best of En Vogue
- 1. "No Fool, No More" Released: September 22, 1998

Professional ratings
Review scores
Source	Rating
AllMusic	link
Robert Christgau	B+ link
The Rolling Stone Album Guide	link

Best of En Vogue is the first greatest hits compilation album by the American R&B/pop group En Vogue. It was released in 1999 on East West Records. The album comprises nearly all of their hit singles released between the years of 1990 and 1998.

The compilation features hit songs from their albums; Born to Sing (1990), Funky Divas (1992), and EV3 (1997). It also includes "No Fool, No More" recorded for the film soundtrack Why Do Fools Fall in Love.

Other tracks include their hits "Don't Let Go (Love)", "Whatta Man", "My Lovin' (You're Never Gonna Get It)", "Free Your Mind", "Runaway Love", and remixes of "Let It Flow" and first hit single, "Hold On".

== Track listing ==
All tracks written by Thomas McElroy and Denzil Foster, except noted otherwise.

No.	Title	Writer(s)	Album	Length
1.	"My Lovin' (You're Never Gonna Get It)"		from the album Funky Divas	4:42
2.	"Hold On"		from the album Born to Sing	5:04
3.	"Whatta Man" (featuring Salt-N-Pepa)	Cheryl James, David Crawford, Hurby Azor	from the album Runaway Love	4:55
4.	"Free Your Mind"		from the album Funky Divas	4:52
5.	"Don't Let Go (Love)"	Andrea Martin, Ivan Matias, Marqueze Ethridge, Organized Noize	from the album EV3	4:51
6.	"Giving Him Something He Can Feel"	Curtis Mayfield	from the album Funky Divas	3:57
7.	"No Fool, No More (Mick Guzauski Mix)"	Diane Warren	from the album Why Do Fools Fall in Love	4:18
8.	"Whatever"	Giuliano Franco, Keith Andes	from the album EV3	4:20
9.	"Lies"	Terry Ellis, Dawn Robinson, Cindy Herron, Maxine Jones, Khayree Shaheed	from the album Born to Sing	4:16
10.	"Give It Up, Turn It Loose"		from the album Funky Divas	5:12
11.	"Runaway Love" (featuring FMob)		from the album Runaway Love	4:59
12.	"Too Gone, Too Long"	Diane Warren	from the album EV3	4:42
13.	"Let It Flow"		from the album EV3	5:38
14.	"Love Don't Love You"		from the album Funky Divas	3:55
15.	"Let It Flow (Funky Food Radio Mix)"		bonus track	3:58
16.	"Hold On (Tuff Jam's Classic Garage Remix)"		bonus track	6:17

== Personnel ==
- Producer – Denzil Foster, Thomas McElroy
- Producer – Babyface
- Producer – David Foster
- Executive producer – Denzil Foster, Thomas McElroy

== Charts ==
Chart (1999)	Peak position
Australian Albums (ARIA)	183
Austrian Albums (Ö3 Austria)	37
Dutch Albums (Album Top 100)	43
German Albums (Offizielle Top 100)	61
UK Albums (Official Charts)	39
UK R&B Albums (Official Charts)	4

== Certifications ==
Region	Certification	Certified units/sales
United Kingdom (BPI)	Silver	60,000^{^}
^{^} Shipments figures based on certification alone.
