= List of awards and nominations received by En Vogue =

This is a list of awards and nominations received by American R&B/pop quartet En Vogue.

== American Music Awards ==
The American Music Awards is an annual awards ceremony created by Dick Clark in 1973.

Year	Nominee / work	Award	Result
1991		Favorite Dance New Artist	Nominated
1991	"Hold On"	Favorite Dance Single	Nominated
1993		Favorite Soul/R&B Band, Duo or Group	Nominated
1993	Funky Divas	Favorite Soul/R&B Album	Won
1994		Favorite Soul/R&B Band, Duo or Group	Won
1995	"Whatta Man" (with Salt-n-Pepa)	Favorite Soul/R&B Single	Nominated
1998		Favorite Soul/R&B Band, Duo or Group	Nominated

== Billboard Music Awards ==
The Billboard Music Awards are sponsored by Billboard magazine to honor artists based on Billboard Year-End Charts. The award ceremony was held from 1990 to 2007. Before and after that time span, winners have been announced by Billboard, both in the press and as part of their year-end issue. The award returned in 2011.

Year	Nominee / work	Award	Result
1990	"Hold On"	Top R&B Single	Won
1990	"Hold On"	Top Dance Sales 12" Single	Nominated
1997		Top Hot 100 Singles Artist Duo/Group	Nominated
1997	"Don't Let Go (Love)"	Top Soundtrack Single	Nominated

== Grammy Awards ==
The Grammy Awards are awarded annually by the National Academy of Recording Arts and Sciences established in 1959.

Year	Nominee / work	Award	Result
1991	Born to Sing	Best R&B Performance Duo or Group with Vocal	Nominated
1993	Funky Divas	Best R&B Performance Duo or Group with Vocal	Nominated
1993	"Free Your Mind"	Best Rock Performance Duo or Group with Vocal	Nominated
1993	"Free Your Mind"	Best Music Video Short Form	Nominated
1994	"Give It Up, Turn It Loose"	Best R&B Performance Duo or Group with Vocal	Nominated
1995	"Whatta Man" (with Salt-n-Pepa)	Best R&B Performance Duo or Group with Vocal	Nominated
1997	"Don't Let Go (Love)"	Best R&B Performance Duo or Group with Vocal	Nominated

== MTV Video Music Awards ==
The MTV Video Music Awards were established in 1984 by MTV to celebrate the top music videos of the year.

Year	Nominee / work	Award	Result
1992	"My Lovin' (You're Never Gonna Get It)"	Best Group Video	Nominated
1992	"My Lovin' (You're Never Gonna Get It)"	Best Dance Video	Nominated
1992	"My Lovin' (You're Never Gonna Get It)"	Best Direction in a Video	Nominated
1992	"My Lovin' (You're Never Gonna Get It)"	Best Choreography in a Video	Won
1992	"My Lovin' (You're Never Gonna Get It)"	Best Editing in a Video	Nominated
1992	"My Lovin' (You're Never Gonna Get It)"	Best Cinematography in a Video	Nominated
1993	"Free Your Mind"	Video of the Year	Nominated
1993	"Free Your Mind"	Best Group Video	Nominated
1993	"Free Your Mind"	Best R&B Video	Won
1993	"Free Your Mind"	Best Dance Video	Won
1993	"Free Your Mind"	Best Direction in a Video	Nominated
1993	"Free Your Mind"	Best Choreography in a Video	Won
1993	"Free Your Mind"	Best Cinematography in a Video	Nominated
1993	"Free Your Mind"	Viewer's Choice	Nominated
1994	"Whatta Man"	Best R&B Video	Won
1994	"Whatta Man"	Best Dance Video	Won
1994	"Whatta Man"	Best Choreography in a Video	Won
1994	"Runaway Love"	Best Dance Video	Nominated

== Soul Train Music Awards ==
The Soul Train Music Awards is an annual award show aired in national broadcast syndication that honors the best in African American music and entertainment established in 1987.

Year	Nominee / work	Award	Result
1991	"Hold On"	Best R&B/Soul Song of the Year	Nominated
1991	"Hold On"	Best R&B/Soul Music Video	Nominated
1991	"Hold On"	Best R&B/Soul Single Group, Band or Duo	Won
1991		Best R&B/Soul New Artist	Nominated
1991	Born to Sing	Best R&B/Soul Album Group, Band or Duo	Nominated
1993		Sammy Davis Jr. Entertainer of the Year	Won
1993	"My Lovin' (You're Never Gonna Get It)"	Best R&B Song of the Year	Nominated
1993	"My Lovin' (You're Never Gonna Get It)"	Best R&B/Soul Single Group, Band or Duo	Nominated
1993	"Giving Him Something He Can Feel"	Best R&B Music Video	Nominated
1993	Funky Divas	Best R&B/Soul Album Group, Band or Duo	Won

=== Soul Train Lady of Soul Awards ===
The Soul Train Lady of Soul Awards is an awards show that honors the accomplishments of women in the music industry established in 1995.

Year	Nominee / work	Award	Result
1997	"Don't Let Go (Love)"	Best R&B/Soul Single Group, Band or Duo	Won
1998	EV3	Best R&B/Soul Album Group, Band or Duo	Nominated
2001	Masterpiece Theatre	Best R&B/Soul Album Group, Band or Duo	Nominated
