= European Tour (En Vogue) =

2025 concert tour by En Vogue

- Tour by En Vogue
- Promotional poster
- Start date: June 18, 2025
- End date: July 6, 2025
- Legs: 1
- No. of shows: 9 in Europe

En Vogue concert chronology
- Hot Summer Nights Tour (2023); European Tour (2025)

The European Tour was a concert and festival tour by American group En Vogue. Their first series of concerts on European soil since 2018, it began on June 18, 2025 in Antwerp, Belgium and concluded on July 6, 2025 in East Sussex, England. The tour marked the return of original member Maxine Jones, who had rejoined the band in February 2025 after their NBA All-Star Game halftime show performance.

== Background ==
On May 7, 2025, En Vogue announced that they would kick off another tour through Europe on June 18, 2025 in Antwerp, Belgium, with Jones, who had performed with them again for the first time in years at the NBA All-Star Game halftime in February 2025, also joining in for the tour.

== Reception ==
Kate Solomon, writing for The Independent, called the performance at Glastonbury Festival a "feel-good hour of pristine vocals and undeniably good vibes." She further commented on the show on June 27, 2025: "The four current members twirl on stage in glimmering black outfits and get everyone dancing from note one. It’s a suburban gen x disco energy (compliment) and the grins are infectious. With harmonies on point, shimmies that have been perfected over decades and "oooh boy" fans snapped open and closed to unbelievably sassy effect, even the lesser-known songs are so shot through with nostalgia that they feel as big as the hits." Safi Bugel from The Guardian wrote about the same show: "After over 30 years of touring, there's no doubt En Vogue know what they're doing [...] While they may sit firmly in legacy act territory, as performers En Vogue have absolutely still got it: their precision harmonies still top-notch, their dance moves sharp. They close with their 1990 hit "Hold On," a good reminder of their strength as musicians in their own right too."

== Set list ==
This set list is representative of the June 18, 2025 show in Antwerp.

1. "My Lovin' (You're Never Gonna Get It)"
2. "You Don't Have to Worry"
3. "Lies"
4. "Give It Up, Turn It Loose"
5. "This Is Your Life"
6. "Love Don't Love You"
7. "Flash Light"
8. "Whatever"
9. "Don't Go"
10. "Leave the Door Open"
11. "Whatta Man"
12. "Free Your Mind"
13. "Yesterday"
14. Cover medley
15. "Rocket"
16. "Reach 4 Me"
17. "Ooh Boy"
18. "Giving Him Something He Can Feel"
19. "Don't Let Go (Love)"
20. "Hold On"

== Tour dates ==
List of concerts with date, city, country, and venue
Date	City	Country	Venue
June 18, 2025	Antwerp	Belgium	De Roma
June 20, 2025	Viborg	Denmark	Forever Festival
June 22, 2025	Woodstock	England	Blenheim Palace
June 24, 2025	Utrecht	Netherlands	Ronda Hall
June 25, 2025	Eindhoven	Netherlands	Effenaar
June 27, 2025	Somerset	England	Glastonbury Festival
June 29, 2025^{[a]}	Casablanca	Morocco	Summer Jam Casablanca
July 4, 2025	Dublin	Ireland	Iveagh Gardens
July 6, 2025	East Sussex	England	Love Supreme Jazz Festival

Notes

- ^{^[a]} Since Casablanca is not in Europe but located on the African continent, it was marked with an asterisk (*) on all promotional material.
