= For the Love of Music =

2017 concert tour by En Vogue

For the Love of Music Tour
- Tour by En Vogue
- Promotional poster
- Associated album: Electric Café
- Start date: April 6, 2017
- End date: April 25, 2017
- Legs: 1
- No. of shows: 13 in Europe

En Vogue concert chronology
- En Vogue: 20th Anniversary Tour (2009–2011); For the Love of Music Tour (2017); 2018 European Tour (2018)

The For the Love of Music Tour was the sixth concert tour by American group En Vogue. Set up ahead of the group's anticipated seventh studio album Electric Café (20179, it was launched on April 6, 2017 in Dublin, Ireland and concluded in Bremen, Germany on April 25.

== Background ==
In 2009, the original members of En Vogue reunited for the 20th Anniversary Tour, performing select dates across North America. Although the group intended to record new music together, original member Dawn Robinson ultimately declined to participate in the album due to unresolved business disagreements following the tour. In May 2012, Maxine Jones also departed the group over contractual disagreements related to a proposed deal with their new label, Rufftown Entertainment. A month later, Rhona Bennett, who had previously replaced Robinson and Jones from 2004 until the band's anniversary, rejoined En Vogue and continued touring with Terry Ellis and Cindy Herron.

In 2014, Bennett, Ellis, and Herron began work on Electric Café, their first original album in more than a decade. In 2016, Herron and Ellis established En Vogue Records and signed a deal with eOne Music to distribute the album. As part of the album's early promotion, the group announced on February 8, 2017, that they would embark on a European tour, called For the Love of Music. In addition to renditions of the group's well-known recorded material as well as new songs from Electric Café, En Vogue decided to perform a tribute to celebrated female singers of times past during an "Old School Medley" section of their show. Notable songs performed were "Respect" by Aretha Franklin and "Proud Mary" by Tina Turner.

== Reception ==
Reviews of For the Love of Music cited the impressive vocals of the group's members as well as the intricate instrumentation of the songs, and praised the group's set list. Louise Bruton, writing for The Irish Times, described the show on April 6, 2017 in Dublin as "like a volcano meeting a lightning bolt." She felt that "at the core of En Vogue's performance is an entertainment model that the likes of The Four Seasons and The Supremes used. They are here to entertain to you by all means necessary [...] Dressed all in black, they lure us in with perfectly choreographed arm flicks and body twists that connect them like a beautiful, mechanical K'Nex display as their earth-shattering vocals hit every note and throw in a few extra, just to be sure." Renowned for Sound editor Brendon Veevers praised the April 7, 2017 show in London, writing: "Over the course of the night En Vogue proved that they can still give the latest pop starlets on the charts a good run for their money as they turned out a nostalgic string of hits to a sold out crowd, bringing the house down with impeccable vocals – individually and with tight-knit harmonies – and a confident strut and swagger that reminded London that they were back in town and they meant business. Dianne Bourne from Manchester Evening News described the April 8, 2017 show in Manchester as "a blistering one hour set. The crowd scream and yell but to no avail for an encore. These ladies know just how to leave an audience begging for more.

== Set list ==
This set list is representative of the April 17, 2017 show in Cologne.

1. "Instrumental Intro"
2. "No No No (Can't Come Back)"
3. "My Lovin' (You're Never Gonna Get It)"
4. "You Don't Have to Worry"
5. "Lies"
6. "Whatta Man"
7. "Ooh Boy"
8. "Free Your Mind"
9. "Give It Up, Turn It Loose"
10. "Emotions"
11. "Deja Vu" (Remixed)
12. "Don't Let Go (Love)"
13. "Old School Medley"
14. "Giving Him Something He Can Feel"
15. "Piece of My Love"
16. "Hold On"

== Tour dates ==
List of concerts
Date	City	Country	Venue
April 6, 2017	Dublin	Ireland	Vicar Street
April 7, 2017	London	England	KOKO
April 8, 2017	Manchester	England	Manchester Academy
April 10, 2017	The Hague	Netherlands	Paard van Troje
April 12, 2017	Hamburg	Germany	Mojo Club
April 13, 2017	Amsterdam	Netherlands	Paradiso
April 15, 2017	Nijmegen	Netherlands	Doornroosje
April 17, 2017	Cologne	Germany	Gloria-Theater
April 19, 2017	Stockholm	Sweden	Nalen
April 21, 2017	Copenhagen	Denmark	DR Byen
April 23, 2017	Frankfurt	Germany	Gibson
April 24, 2017	Paris	France	La Cigale
April 25, 2017	Bremen	Germany	Schlachthof
