= 2018 European Tour (En Vogue) =

2018 concert tour by En Vogue

- Tour by En Vogue
- Promotional poster
- Associated album: Electric Café
- Start date: April 2, 2018
- End date: April 16, 2018
- Legs: 1
- No. of shows: 12 in Europe

En Vogue concert chronology
- For the Love of Music Tour (2017); 2018 European Tour (2017); Mixtape Tour (2022)

The 2018 European Tour was the seventh concert tour by American group En Vogue. Launched in support of their seventh studio album, Electric Café (2018), it began on April 2, 2018 in Dublin, Ireland and concluded on April 16, 2018 in Esch-sur-Alzette, Luxembourg.

== Background ==
In 2014, Bennett, Ellis, and Herron began work on Electric Café, their first original album in more than a decade. In 2016, Herron and Ellis established En Vogue Records and signed a deal with eOne Music to distribute the album. As part of the album's early promotion, the group embarked on the For the Love of Music Tour, which took them across Europe in April 2017 with 13 shows. The concert tour earned largely favorable reviews from critics, who praised the group's powerful vocals, the intricate instrumentation of their songs, and the thoughtfully curated set list. Encouraged by the positive response to their 2017 tour, En Vogue announced on January 15, 2018, that they would kick off a 2018 European Tour on April 2, 2017 in Dublin, Ireland, with tickets going on sale on January 19, 2018.

== Reception ==
Kelly Jobanputra, writing for independent online newspaper Bristol24/7, captured the show on April 5, 2017 as a "totally fun packed evening that reminded us all that great music and performers truly stand the test of time." She further wrote: "All Hats off to these ladies for giving as much gusto during the whole gig as they did back in their heyday, it's unbelievable really that two out of the three current members are now in their 50s. They've got it, they know they’ve got it and we all know they’ve got it." Caroline Sullivan from The Guardian described the April 6, 2017 show in Birmingham as a "stripped-back masterclass." She noted that "Herron and bandmates Terry Ellis and Rhona Bennett perform on a bare stage, accompanied only by a backing track, which initially seems an unfittingly low-budget way to go about things, but turns out to be a smart move. Without the distraction of dancers and costume changes [...] these three are exceptional harmonists. As the voices entwine and fall away, it’s like listening to a waterfall." The Times commented on the group's opening show on April 2, 2018: "The group exhale brilliant harmonies throughout the set, with brief but delicious throwbacks to the era of The Supremes, The Ronettes and Martha and the Vandellas. Although the dance moves and styling perhaps have not stood the test of time, there's no escaping the impressive vocal range and unity of the group."

== Set list ==
This set list is representative of the April 13, 2017 show in Frankfurt am Main.

1. "My Lovin' (You're Never Gonna Get It)"
2. "You Don't Have to Worry"
3. "Lies"
4. "Whatta Man"
5. "I'm Good"
6. "Reach 4 Me"
7. "Don't Let Go (Love)"
8. "Blue Skies"
9. "Giving Him Something He Can Feel"
10. "Ooh Boy"
11. "Piece of My Love"
12. "Rocket"
13. "Hold On"

Encore

14. "Free Your Mind"

== Tour dates ==
List of concerts
Date	City	Country	Venue
April 2, 2018	Dublin	Ireland	Vicar Street
April 3, 2018	Belfast	Ireland	Mandela Hall
April 5, 2018	Bristol	England	O2 Academy
April 6, 2018	Birmingham	England	O2 Institute
April 7, 2018	Manchester	England	Academy 2
April 8, 2018	Glasgow	Scotland	ABC
April 10, 2018	London	England	Indigo 2
April 11, 2018	Amsterdam	Netherlands	Melkweg
April 13, 2018	Frankfurt am Main	Germany	Gibson
April 14, 2018	Rotterdam	Netherlands	Annabel
April 15, 2018	Hamburg	Germany	Mojo Club
April 16, 2018	Esch-sur-Alzette	Luxembourg	Rockhal
