= What Is Love (En Vogue song) =

Single by En Vogue

from the album Funky Divas
- Released: October 26, 1993
- Recorded: Autumn 1991–August 1993
- Genre: Pop/R&B
- Length: 4:42
- Label: EastWest
- Songwriter: Thomas Derrick McElroy & Denzil Delano Foster

En Vogue singles chronology
"Runaway Love" (1993)	"What Is Love" (1993)	"Whatta Man" (1993)

"What Is Love" is a song by American group En Vogue, released on October 26, 1993, as the final single from their second album, Funky Divas (1992). The song was not released commercially, but was instead shipped to dance clubs across the United States. "What Is Love" is written by Thomas Derrick McElroy & Denzil Delano Foster and reached the top 10 of the US dance chart. The song appeared again in 1993 as part of the group's Runaway Love EP. This was the only song En Vogue produced for market featuring Maxine Jones and Cindy Herron sharing lead vocals. It was initially supposed to be included on the EP Remix to Sing as a new song, but missed the production deadline and was added to their subsequent album Funky Divas.

== Critical reception ==
Larry Flick from Billboard magazine named the song "the only house-minded moment" on Funky Divas, adding that it "has been nicely retouched with a thick'n'chewy underground groove by Mentalinstrum, who is better known as a member of the Smack Productions posse. He has done a fine job of taking the song to interesting new depths, while wisely keeping those nifty vocals front and center at all times." Arion Berger from Entertainment Weekly said the album "has an awkward charm", especially on "What Is Love", "in which they archly recite dictionary definitions of the word." Cheo H. Coker from Stanford Daily described the song as "a house groove" with "a rather funky, upbeat note", and added that it "will also be a commercial success." Retrospectively, Pop Rescue noted that "parts of this song" reminds "a bit of Deee-Lite's 'What Is Love?', pieces of Madonna‘s 'Vogue', CeCe Peniston and Kym Sims." They added that "the vocals really belt out here, and at times, it doesn’t sound very much like En Vogue amongst all the spoken word sections, and sampled bits."

== Charts ==
Chart (1993)	Peak position
US Dance Club Songs (Billboard)	6
US Dance Singles Sales (Billboard) with "Runaway love"	17
