= Jason O. Wilson =

Martial arts trainer and author

Jason O. Wilson is an American author and martial arts coach.

== Career ==
Wilson is featured in the documentary film The Cave of Adullam, produced by Laurence Fishburne and directed by Laura Checkoway, which debuted at the Tribeca Film Festival in 2022 and is distributed online by ESPN Films as of 2023. Wilson founded a program by the same name in 2008, a martial arts academy with a mission to help young boys in Detroit, MI, overcome negative emotions and grow into successful men, the basis for the documentary. One of the techniques used in the program was included in an episode of NBC's hit show This is Us in November 2016 (used by the show without Wilson's prior permission) and video clips showing Wilson's technique went viral. The documentary won 3 awards at the Tribeca Film Festival and one award at the Vail Film Festival and is endorsed by NBA team owner, Tom Gores.

Wilson has authored several books including Cry Like a Man and Battle Cry, which help grown men to process emotions for better mental health & life success. His third book, The Man the Moment Demands, is scheduled for release in January 2025.
