= No Fool, No More =

1998 single by En Vogue

Single by En Vogue

from the album Why Do Fools Fall in Love and Best of En Vogue
- Released: August 3, 1998
- Length: 4:42
- Label: EastWest
- Songwriter: Diane Warren
- Producers: Big Baby; Sugar Mike

En Vogue singles chronology
"Too Gone, Too Long" (1997)	"No Fool, No More" (1998)	"Riddle" (2000)

Alternative cover
- UK release

"No Fool, No More" is a song by American female group En Vogue. It was written by Diane Warren and recorded for the soundtrack to the romantic drama film Why Do Fools Fall in Love (1998), while production was helmed by Big Baby and Sugar Mike. The song was released as the album's lead single and entered the top 40 of the US Billboard Hot R&B Singles chart as well as the New Zealand Singles Chart. "No Fool, No More" was later included on their 1998 hits compilation album Best of En Vogue.

== Critical reception ==
Larry Flick of Billboard wrote, "The soundtrack to "Why Do Fools Fall In Love ?" spawns a potential smash in the form of this smooth slow jam. The members of En Vogue are at their harmonious best here—no surprise, right? Considering the lackluster tone of much of the group's last album, "EV3", it kinda is. The members have clearly rediscovered their groove, and their chemistry is now stronger than ever. Producers Big Baby and Sugar Mike dress the ladies in subtle retro-funk instrumentation, keeping the gimmicks to a bare minimum. One listen to this gorgeous recording is simply not enough. You have to go back and listen to it again and again and again."

== Commercial reception ==
"No Fool, No More" peaked within the top 40 of the Billboard Hot R&B Singles chart, peaked at number 57 on the Billboard Hot 100, and reached number 34 in New Zealand. In 1998, the award-winning group promoted the song by performing on several day time talk shows, including The Rosie O'Donnell Show, The Oprah Winfrey Show and The Tonight Show.

== Track listing ==
German maxi-CD single
No.	Title	Writer(s)	Producer(s)	Length
1.	"No Fool, No More" (Mick Guzauski Radio Version)	Diane Warren	Big Baby; Sugar Mike; Mick Guzauski^{[a]}	3:44
2.	"No Fool, No More" (Ben Arrindell Radio Version)	Warren	Big Baby; Sugar Mike; Ben Arrindell^{[a]}	4:03
3.	"Hold On" (Tuff Jam Remix)	En Vogue; Denzil Foster; Thomas McElroy	Foster & McElroy; Karl Brown; Matt Lamont^{[b]}	4:04

UK CD single
No.	Title	Writer(s)	Producer(s)	Length
1.	"No Fool, No More" (Mick Guzauski Radio Version)	Warren	Big Baby; Sugar Mike; Guzauski^{[a]}	3:44
2.	"No Fool, No More" (Ben Arrindell Radio Version)	Warren	Big Baby; Sugar Mike; Arrindell^{[a]}	4:03

US CD single
No.	Title	Writer(s)	Producer(s)	Length
1.	"No Fool, No More" (Album Version)	Warren	Big Baby; Sugar Mike	4:04
2.	"Get Contact" (performed by Missy Elliott & Busta Rhymes)		Timbaland; Elliott	3:30

Notes

- ^{^[a]} denotes additional producer(s)

== Personnel ==
Personnel are adapted from the liner notes of the Why Do Fools Fall in Love soundtrack.

- Lead Vocals, Backing Vocals – Cindy Herron, Terry Ellis, Maxine Jones
- Arranged [Strings] – Big Baby
- Bass – Dominick Maybank
- Drums [Live] – Michael Allen
- Engineer [Assisted] – Milton Chan
- Guitar – Bernard Grobman
- Mastered By – Steve Hall
- Programming, Instruments – Flavahood
- Remix, Engineer, Mixed – Ben Arrindell
- Mixed, Compose – Diane Warren
- Producer – Darryl 'Big Baby' McClary, Michael 'Sugar Mike' Allen

== Charts ==
Chart (1998)	Peak position
New Zealand (Recorded Music NZ)	34
US Billboard Hot 100	57
US Hot R&B/Hip-Hop Songs (Billboard)	37
