= Runaway Love (EP) =

EP by En Vogue
- Released: September 21, 1993
- Recorded: September 1991 – August 1993
- Length: 29:18
- Label: East West
- Producer: Thomas McElroy; Denzil Foster

En Vogue chronology
Funky Divas (1992)	Runaway Love (1993)	EV3 (1997)

Singles from Runaway Love
- 1. "Runaway Love" Released: August 26, 1993; 2. "Whatta Man" Released: December 2, 1993

Runaway Love is an EP by American recording group En Vogue. It was released by East West Records on September 21, 1993, in the United States. The EP followed their multi-platinum hit album Funky Divas in 1992. The EP contains the title track, "Runaway Love" featuring FMob, known as Thomas McElroy and Denzil Foster.

== Critical reception ==
Professional ratings
Review scores
Source	Rating
AllMusic	2/5 stars
Christgau's Consumer Guide	A−
Entertainment Weekly	A−
Los Angeles Times	3/4 stars
The Rolling Stone Album Guide	3.5/5 stars
Vibe	(favorable)

AllMusic editor Stephen Thomas Erlewine found that "apart from the great title track, there is little in this collection of filler and remixes of interest to anyone but dedicated fans." James Earl Hardy from Entertainment Weekly wrote: "Even on an EP, the ladies have got it goin’ on. The remixes of "Hip Hop Lover," "Desire," and "What Is Love" are smokin’, while the new tunes [...] prove these divas have more in common with The Emotions and The Sweet Inspirations than with The Supremes."

== Commercial reception ==
Runaway Love debuted at number 57 on the US Billboard 200 and number 17 on the Top R&B/Hip-Hop Albums chart in the week of July 5, 1993, with first-week sales of 17,500 copies. It eventually peaked at number 49 on the Billboard 200 and 16 on the Top R&B/Hip-Hop Albums chart. The self-titled lead single from Runaway Love quickly became a hit on US Pop and R&B: Also included is the hit collaboration with Salt-N-Pepa, titled "Whatta Man", a top five hit on Billboard's Hot 100 and Top R&B Songs. The EP also features new remixes of "What Is Love", "Desire", and "Hip Hop Lover" from the Funky Divas album.

== Track listing ==
All songs written and produced by Denzil Foster and Thomas McElroy, except noted otherwise.

No.	Title	Writer(s)	Producer(s)	Length
1.	"Runaway Love (E.P. Version)" (featuring FMob)			4:58
2.	"Whatta Man" (Salt-N-Pepa featuring En Vogue)	Cheryl James; Dave Crawford; Hurby Azor	Hurby "Luv Bug" Azor; Salt-N-Pepa	4:54
3.	"Hip Hop Lover (Hip Hop Remix)"			4:18
4.	"Desire (Dancehall Remix)"			3:57
5.	"What Is Love (Club Mix)"			5:35
6.	"Runaway Love (Extended Version)" (featuring FMob)			5:36
Total length:				29:18

== Credits and personnel ==
Credits adapted from the liner notes of Runaway Love.

- Lead Vocals, Backing Vocals – Cindy Herron, Dawn Robinson, Terry Ellis, Maxine Jones
- Arranged – Thomas McElroy And Denzil Foster
- Production – Angela Skinner, Marie McElroy
- Guitar – Marlon McClain
- Flute – Lewis Taylor
- Backing Vocals – 3 Feet
- Keyboards, Drum Programming – Denzil Foster, Thomas McElroy
- Rap Vocals – Kam
- Keyboards – Leroy Romans
- Bass – Wycliff "Steelie" Johnson
- Rap Vocals – FMob
- Art Direction – Jean Cronin
- Mastered [EP] – Tony Dawsey
- Recorded – Steve Counter, Steven Hart
- Mixed [Mixing Engineer] – Ken Kessie
- Design – Cicero deGuzman Jr.
- Photography – James Calderaro
- Composer – Hurby Azor, Cheryl James
- Composer – Thomas McElroy, Denzil Foster
- Executive-Producer – Thomas McElroy, Denzil Foster
- Producer – Denzil Foster, Thomas McElroy

== Charts ==
Weekly chart performance for Runaway Love
Chart (1993)	Peak position
US Billboard 200	49
US Top R&B/Hip-Hop Albums (Billboard)	16
