= Soul Train Music Award for Sammy Davis Jr. – Entertainer of the Year =

Annual US music award

This page lists the winners and nominees for the Soul Train Music Sammy Davis Jr. Award for Entertainer of the Year. At times the award was given out twice in a year, honoring male and female artists separately. Beyoncé was the only artist to have won this award twice in the show's history (once solo and once with Destiny's Child) until 2009, when Michael Jackson was posthumously awarded his second Entertainer of the Year.

== Winners ==
Winners are listed first and highlighted in bold.

=== 1980s ===
Year	Artist	Ref
1989
1989	**Michael Jackson**	

=== 1990s ===
Year	Artist	Ref
1990
1990	**Arsenio Hall**	
1991
1991	**MC Hammer**	
1992
1992	**Janet Jackson**	
1993
1993	**En Vogue**	
1994
1994	**Whitney Houston**	
1995
1995	**Queen Latifah**	
1996
1996	**Boyz II Men**	
1997
1997	**Babyface**	
1998
1998	**Sean "Puffy" Combs**	
1999
1999	**R. Kelly** (Male)	
1999	**Lauryn Hill** (Female)	

=== 2000s ===
Year	Artist	Ref
2000
2000	**DMX** (Male)	
2000	**Mary J. Blige** (Female)	
2001
2001	**Jay Z** (Male)	
2001	**Destiny's Child** (Female)	
2002
2002	**Dr. Dre** (Male)	
2002	**Alicia Keys** (Female)	
2003
2003	**Nelly**	
2004
2004	**Outkast** (Male)	
2004	**Beyoncé** (Female)	
2005
2005	**Usher** (Male)	
2005	**Ciara** (Female)	
2006
2006	**John Legend**	
2007
2007	**Jennifer Hudson**	
2008
2008	—	
2009
2009	**Michael Jackson**	
