= Funky Divas =

Studio album by En Vogue
- Released: March 24, 1992
- Recorded: May 1991 – January 1992
- Studios: Fantasy Studios (Berkeley, California)
- Genre: R&B
- Length: 52:18
- Label: East West
- Producers: Thomas McElroy; Denzil Foster

En Vogue chronology
Remix to Sing (1991)	Funky Divas (1992)	Runaway Love (1993)

Singles from Funky Divas
- 1. "My Lovin' (You're Never Gonna Get It)" Released: March 17, 1992; 2. "Giving Him Something He Can Feel" Released: June 11, 1992; 3. "Free Your Mind" Released: September 24, 1992; 4. "Give It Up, Turn It Loose" Released: November 19, 1992; 5. "Love Don't Love You" Released: January 29, 1993

Funky Divas is the second studio album by American recording group En Vogue, released by Atlantic Records division East West on March 24, 1992, in the United States. Conceived after the success of their Grammy Award–nominated debut album Born to Sing (1990), En Vogue reteamed with their founders Denzil Foster and Thomas McElroy to work on the entire album. As with Born to Sing, the pair borrowed from contemporary R&B, new jack swing and hip hop, while also incorporating classic soul, blues and doo-wop elements, particularly on its on two Sparkle cover versions, as well as, in the case of "Free Your Mind", heavy metal sounds.

Funky Divas debuted at number one on the US Billboard Top R&B Albums chart, and at number eight on the Billboard 200, while peaking at number four on the UK Albums Chart. It reached triple platinum status in the US, where it sold 3.5 million copies, becoming the seventh highest-selling R&B albums of the year as well as En Vogue's biggest-selling album to date. The album spawned five singles, including "My Lovin' (You're Never Gonna Get It)", Aretha Franklin cover "Giving Him Something He Can Feel", "Free Your Mind", "Give It Up, Turn It Loose" and "Love Don't Love You".

The album became the quartet's second album to earn a nomination for the Grammy Award for Best R&B Performance by a Duo or Group with Vocals at the 35th Annual Grammy Awards, while winning American Music Award for Favorite Soul/R&B Album at the American Music Awards of 1993 and the Sammy Davis Jr. Award for Entertainer of the Year at the 1993 Soul Train Music Awards.

== Critical reception ==
Professional ratings
Review scores
Source	Rating
AllMusic	5/5 stars
The Encyclopedia of Popular Music	4/5 stars
Entertainment Weekly	B−
Los Angeles Times	3/4 stars
Orlando Sentinel	2/3 stars
The Philadelphia Inquirer	3.5/4 stars
Q	4/5 stars
Rolling Stone	2/5 stars
The Rolling Stone Album Guide	4/5 stars
Select	3/5

Funky Divas received generally positive reviews from music critics, but has since earned retrospective acclaim. Parry Gettelman from The Orlando Sentinel complimented Denzil Foster & Thomas McElroy's production on the album. While somewhat critical with the slower songs, she wrote that "the pair has a knack for both melodies and killer grooves, and they're gifted, playful arrangers." With the performances, Gettelman found that "En Vogue interprets both the McElroy & Foster tracks and three covers with style, verve and a lot of soul." Los Angeles Times writer Connie Johnson that the album was "clearly groomed to offer a '90s slant to The Supremes' classy crossover image, En Vogue lifts ideas from James Brown and Aretha Franklin to create a sharper, more streetwise package." People magazine wrote that "En Vogue succeeds best at light danceable funk embroidered with soaring, swooping vocals. Maybe the album title promises a bit more than what’s delivered. But Spunky Hip-Hop Gals Who Can Sing Their Fannies Off would have been just too long, we guess."

Arion Berger, writing for Entertainment Weekly, felt that Funky Divas "delivers flirtatious R&B set to a mechanized beat [...] The four sweet-voiced members of En Vogue are versatile enough to handle reggae-, gospel- and doo-wop-tinted dance music with game if not very deep enthusiasm. Still, Funky Divas has an awkward charm." In her uneven review for Rolling Stone journalist Danyel Smith wrote that "En Vogue come off, on Funky Divas, as voluptuously voiced and impeccably rehearsed as they did on their 1990 debut, Born to Sing. But the audacious production that outfitted Dawn, Terry, Cindy and Maxine has not found its way to 1992." She felt that "on the debut, the Sixties girl-group allusions were perfect enough to seem accidental, but this time they clunk around obviously and loudly, like there's a fifth woman in an ugly dress singing along with Maxine, Cindy, Dawn and Terry – and she's sadly off-key."

In his retrospective review, AllMusic editor Jose F. Promis wrote that "combining sass, elegance, and class with amazing vocals and perfect production, this delightful set stands as one of the 1990s definitive pop albums." He found that the album "is basically free of filler" and called it the "era's most diverse, dazzling, and exciting pieces of work." In 2011, Rolling Stone magazine ranked the album 60th on its list of the 100 Best Albums of the '90s and second best album of the 90's by a female group, while Complex magazine listed it 45th on its The 50 Best R&B Albums of the '90s listing in 2017. Complex editor Craig Jenkins stated that while "En Vogue's 1990 debut Born to Sing introduced Cindy, Dawn, Maxine, and Terry's throwback quartet-style harmonies to the world, the 1992 follow-up Funky Divas fashioned it into a weapon." He found that the album paved the way for other female bands such as TLC and Destiny's Child. In 2020, Enio Chiola of PopMatters named it the most "overlooked and underrated" album of the 1990s.

== Chart performance ==
In the United States, Funky Divas debuted at number eight on the Billboard 200 album chart and reached the top spot on Billboard's Top R&B/Hip-Hop Albums chart with first week sales of 60,000 units. A major commercial success, it became one of the biggest-selling R&B albums of year, exceeding sales of more than 3.5 million copies domestically. It was eventually certified triple platinum by the Recording Industry Association of America (RIAA) on March 24, 1993. Billboard ranked Funky Divas 25th on its Billboard 200 year-end chart, while ranking it seventh on the Top R&B Albums year-end chart. As of 2018, it remain En Vogue's highest-peaking album on both charts.

Internationally, Funky Divas reached the top forty of the national album charts in Canada, the Netherlands, New Zealand, and Sweden. A steady seller in Canada, the album eventually was certified platinum by the Canadian Recording Industry Association (CRIA). The album reached its highest peak in the United Kingdom, where it peaked at number four on the UK Albums Chart and reached gold status, indicating sales in excess of 100,000 copies. With a worldwide sales total of 5 million, Funky Divas remains En Vogue's biggest seller within their discography.

== Singles ==
Lead single "My Lovin' (You're Never Gonna Get It)" became an instant hit, peaking at number two on the US Billboard Hot 100 and number 4 on the UK Singles Chart. The accompanying video for "My Lovin'" won a MTV Video Music Award for Best Choreography at the 1992 MTV Video Music Awards. The song samples the funk guitar line of James Brown's 1973 song "The Payback" from the album of the same name. Second single "Giving Him Something He Can Feel," a cover of the Aretha Franklin hit from the film Sparkle (1976), also became a top ten hit in the US. Funky Diva's third single, the rock-infused "Free Your Mind", became another top ten hit. In the UK, the song made the top 20. The video for "Free Your Mind" won three MTV Video Music Awards for Best R&B Video, Best Dance Video and Best Choreography at the 1993 MTV Video Music Awards.

By the time the fourth single, "Give It Up, Turn It Loose", was released in late 1992, the Funky Divas album was already certified triple platinum in the US by the RIAA. The single gave the group another UK top 40 hit. The fifth and final single released from Funky Divas was "Love Don't Love You", which was remixed for its release. The video for the single consists of clips from previous En Vogue videos "Giving Him Something He Can Feel", "Free Your Mind", as well as two of their 1990 videos "Lies" and "You Don't Have to Worry". A second edition of the album containing the later hits "Runaway Love" and "Whatta Man" (with Salt-N-Pepa) was released in the UK in 1994. This edition of Funky Divas also includes remixed versions of "Hip Hop Lover", "It Ain't Over Till the Fat Lady Sings", and "Love Don't Love You" (a different remix from the US single release in 1993), along with slightly altered artwork inside the CD booklet.

== Track listing ==
All songs written and produced by Denzil Foster & Thomas McElroy, except where noted.

Funky Divas track listing
No.	Title	Writer(s)	Length
1.	"This Is Your Life"		5:05
2.	"My Lovin' (You're Never Gonna Get It)"		4:42
3.	"Hip Hop Lover"		5:13
4.	"Free Your Mind"		4:52
5.	"Desire"		4:01
6.	"Giving Him Something He Can Feel"	Curtis Mayfield	3:56
7.	"It Ain't Over Till the Fat Lady Sings"		4:13
8.	"Give It Up, Turn It Loose"		5:13
9.	"Yesterday"	John Lennon; Paul McCartney	2:30
10.	"Hooked on Your Love"	Mayfield	3:35
11.	"Love Don't Love You"		3:56
12.	"What Is Love"		4:19
13.	"Thanks/Prayer"		0:43

30th Anniversary Expanded Edition
No.	Title	Producer(s)	Length
14.	"Free Your Mind" (Theo's Rec And Wreck Mix)	Foster; McElroy; Theo Mizuhara^{[a]}	4:55
15.	"Free Your Mind" (Tommy's Spoiled Brat Mix)	Foster; McElroy; Mizuhara^{[a]}	5:02
16.	"Free Your Mind" (James' Club Mix)	Foster; James Earley^{[a]}	4:57
17.	"Give It Up, Turn It Loose" (Kevin's Extended R&B Mix)	Foster; McElroy; Kevin Dean^{[a]}	5:18
18.	"Give It Up, Turn It Loose" ("Welcome to the Ghetto" Hip Hop Mix)	Foster; McElroy; Dean^{[a]}; Dominique Trenier^{[b]}	5:27
19.	"Give It Up, Turn It Loose" (Kevin's Extended Jazz Mix)	Foster; McElroy; Dean^{[a]}	5:00
20.	"Give It Up, Turn It Loose" (Somethin' for the People Remix)	Foster; McElroy; Somethin' for the People^{[a]}	5:51
21.	"My Lovin' (You're Never Gonna Get It)" (Hype Radio Remix)		5:12

Notes

- ^{^[a]} denotes additional producer(s)
- ^{^[b]} denotes additional co-producer(s)

== Samples ==
- "My Lovin' (You're Never Gonna Get It)" contains a sample of the guitar riff from the James Brown song "The Payback" from the album of the same name, which is looped throughout the entire song and forms the basis of the melody.
- On first pressings and the 2022 remaster, "Hip Hop Lover" contains a sample of "Funk You Up" By The Sequence. The sample was later edited out of the song on later pressings but was re-instated when the 30th Anniversary Expanded Edition was released to streaming services in 2022.

== Personnel ==
Credits are taken from the album's liner notes.

En Vogue

- Terry Ellis – vocals
- Cindy Herron – vocals
- Maxine Jones – vocals
- Dawn Robinson – vocals

Musicians

- Denzil Foster – keyboards, drum machine programming, dialogues
- Thomas McElroy – keyboards, drum machine programming, dialogues
- Jinx Jones – guitars, guitar solos, bass
- James "Jinx" Gardner – guitars
- Michael Fellows – drums
- Jon Bendich – percussion
- Juan Escovedo – percussion
- Peter Michael – percussion
- Les Harris – saxophones
- Jeffrey McCormick – saxophones, sax solos
- Chris Mondt – trombone
- Tony George – trumpet
- Chuckii Booker – dialogues
- Wayne Jackson – rap (3, 7)

Production

- Denzil Foster – executive producer, producer, arrangements
- Thomas McElroy – executive producer, producer, arrangements
- Steve Counter – engineer
- Neil King – additional engineer
- Michael Seminack – additional engineer
- Ken Kessie – mixing at Can-Am Studios (Tarzana, California)
- John Jackson – mix assistant
- Brian Gardner – mastering at Bernie Grundman Mastering (Hollywood, California)
- Kay Arbuckle – production coordinator
- Elizabeth Barrett – art direction
- Larry Anderson – logo design
- Daniel & Louise – photography
- Reisig & Taylor – photography
- David Lombard Management – management

== Charts ==
=== Weekly charts ===
Weekly chart performance for Funky Divas
Chart (1992–1993)	Peak position
Australian Albums (ARIA)	66
Canada Top Albums/CDs (RPM)	34
Dutch Albums (Album Top 100)	37
European Albums (Music & Media)	41
Finnish Albums (Suomen virallinen lista)	39
German Albums (Offizielle Top 100)	58
New Zealand Albums (RMNZ)	36
Swedish Albums (Sverigetopplistan)	31
UK Albums (Official Charts)	4
US Billboard 200	8
US Top R&B/Hip-Hop Albums (Billboard)	1

=== Year-end charts ===
1992 year-end chart performance for Funky Divas
Chart (1992)	Position
US Billboard 200	25
US Top R&B/Hip-Hop Albums (Billboard)	7

1993 year-end chart performance for Funky Divas
Chart (1993)	Position
UK Albums (OCC)	60
US Billboard 200	46
US Top R&B/Hip-Hop Albums (Billboard)	37

== Certifications ==
Certifications for Funky Divas
Region	Certification	Certified units/sales
Canada (Music Canada)	Platinum	100,000^{^}
United Kingdom (BPI)	Gold	100,000^{^}
United States (RIAA)	3× Platinum	4,416,000 (Note: As of October 1997, Funky Divas had sold 3,500,000 copies in the United States according to Nielsen SoundScan, which does not count albums sold through clubs like the BMG Music Club, where it sold 916,000 copies. Combined, it has sold over 4,416,000 copies in the US.)
^{^} Shipments figures based on certification alone.

== Release history ==
Funky Divas release history
Region	Date	Edition	Label	Format	Ref(s)
United States	March 24, 1992	Standard edition	East West Records	CD; cassette; vinyl	
Various	March 25, 2022	30th Anniversary expanded edition	Rhino Entertainment	CD; digital download	

== See also ==
- List of number-one R&B albums of 1992 (U.S.)
