= Love Don't Love You =

1993 single by En Vogue

Single by En Vogue

from the album Funky Divas
- Released: February 11, 1993
- Recorded: Late 1991—January 1992
- Genre: New jack swing
- Length: 3:54
- Label: EastWest
- Songwriters: Thomas McElroy; Denzil Foster
- Producers: Thomas McElroy; Denzil Foster

En Vogue singles chronology
"Give It Up, Turn It Loose" (1992)	"Love Don't Love You" (1993)	"Runaway Love" (1993)

"Love Don't Love You" is a song by American R&B/pop vocal group En Vogue, released in February 1993 by Eastwest Records as the final single from their second album, Funky Divas (1992). The song was both written and produced by Thomas McElroy and Denzil Foster, and became the group's fifth consecutive top-40 single from the album in the United States. It peaked at numbers 36 and 31 on the US Billboard Hot 100 and Cash Box Top 100. The song is led by group members Terry Ellis and Cindy Herron.

== Critical reception ==
AllMusic editor Jose F. Promis described "Love Don't Love You" as "jazzy". Larry Flick from Billboard magazine wrote, "There just ain't no stoppin' these funky divas", adding that the new single "is a bit more aggressive and catchy than the previous 'Give It Up, Turn It Loose'. Syncopated funk beats clip at an easy pace, supporting an intricate and expectedly harmonious vocal arrangement." Randy Clark from Cash Box viewed it as a "particular scantily-arranged cut". Dave Sholin from the Gavin Report complimented its "dynamic production, incredible harmonies and great material [that] make an unbeatable formula." A reviewer from Music & Media said, "Funk, rock, pop, jazz, well ladies, what's it gonna be this time? The "funky divas of all trades" go swing beat, with lovely results of course."

Alan Jones from Music Week wrote that they "return with a nagging jack swing track that will remind Jade what they're up against in the battle of the funky divas." He added, "The singing is as good as it gets, but some of the mixes are a bit on the flabby side, and probably diminish rather than broaden its appeal." Pete Stanton from Smash Hits gave the song three out of five, declaring it as a "funky number that oozes something extremely naughty and tasty. Not as powerful as the last few singles but still as groove-filled as you'd expect from the Divas." Cheo H. Coker from Stanford Daily felt that it "isn't bad, but just doesn't pack as much punch as other cuts on the effort." Retrospectively, Pop Rescue stated that the vocals "are beautiful, and sit perfectly alongside the beats and bassline." They concluded, "It's brilliant."

== Track list and formats ==
- US cassette single

A. "Love Don't Love You" – 3:56
B. "Yesterday" – 2:30

- European CD maxi-single (Remixes)
1. "Love Don't Love You (Remix Edit 1) – 4:07
2. "Love Don't Love You (Remix 1) – 5:56
3. "Love Don't Love You (Remix 2) – 5:52
4. "It Ain't Over Till The Fat Lady Sings" – 4:12
- UK CD single
1. "Love Don't Love You (Remix 1) – 5:54
2. "Love Don't Love You (Remix 2) – 5:51
3. "Love Don't Love You (Remix Dub) – 3:54
4. "Love Don't Love You (Remix Edit 1) – 4:07
5. "Love Don't Love You" (LP Version) – 3:56
- US CD single
1. "Love Don't Love You" (Remix Edit 1) – 4:03
2. "Love Don't Love You" (Remix Edit 2) – 4:04
3. "Love Don't Love You" (LP Version) – 3:54

== Personnel ==
- Lead vocals, background vocals – Terry Ellis, Cindy Herron
- Background vocals – Cindy Herron, Terry Ellis, Maxine Jones, Dawn Robinson
- Producer, Arranger – Denzil Foster & Thomas McElroy
- Executive-Producer – Thomas McElroy & Denzil Foster
- Drum Programming – Antoine "Doc" Judkins
- Engineer – Conley Abrams
- Remix producer – Darren "Nitro" Clowers

== Charts ==
Chart (1993)	Peak position
UK Singles (Official Charts)	64
UK Dance (Music Week)	24
US Billboard Hot 100	36
US Hot R&B/Hip-Hop Songs (Billboard)	31
US Pop Airplay (Billboard)	28
US Rhythmic Airplay (Billboard)	20
US Cash Box Top 100	31

== Release history ==
Region	Date	Format(s)	Label(s)	Ref.
United States	February 11, 1993	12-inch vinyl; cassette	EastWest	
United Kingdom	March 29, 1993	7-inch vinyl; CD; cassette	EastWest	
