= Runaway Love (En Vogue song) =

1993 single by En Vogue

Single by En Vogue

from the album Runaway Love
- Released: September 27, 1993
- Genre: Funk hip hop; swingbeat; R&B
- Length: 4:59
- Label: EastWest America
- Songwriters: Thomas McElroy; Denzil Foster
- Producers: Thomas McElroy; Denzil Foster

En Vogue singles chronology
"Love Don't Love You" (1993)	"Runaway Love" (1993)	"What Is Love" (1993)

Music video
- "Runaway Love" on YouTube

"Runaway Love" is a song by American R&B/pop group En Vogue, released in September 1993 by EastWest America Records as the first single from the group's extended play (EP) Runaway Love. After the huge success of their second album, Funky Divas (1992), the single was released. It was written and produced by Thomas McElroy and Denzil Foster. Group members Cindy Herron and Terry Ellis share lead vocals, Dawn Robinson leads on the bridge, and spoken intro is by Maxine Jones. Elroy and Foster contributed vocals and spoken rap, the latter under the alias FMob group. In the US, the song reached numbers 51 and 43 on the Billboard Hot 100 and Cash Box Top 100.

== Reception ==
=== Commercial reception ===
The single was released to radio in late August 1993 and was immediately added to airplay rotation, debuting on the US Hot 100 Airplay at #31 the week of September 4, 1993. The physical single was not released until almost two months later, after maximum airplay had been reached, resulting in the failure of the single to peak within the Top 40 of the Billboard Hot 100. In Europe, it debuted and peaked at number 83 in its first week on the Eurochart Hot 100 on 16 October 1993, after charting in the UK, where it peaked at number 36. On the Music Week Dance Singles chart, it was more successful, reaching number ten, as well as peaking at number nine on the Music & Media European Dance Radio Chart. "Runaway Love" was also a top-30 hit in Canada, a top-50 hit in the Netherlands, and a top-70 hit in Australia.

Failure of the single to chart higher was possibly due to "Runaway Love" initially being available only on the EP. The EP had been released shortly after the single was issued and was considered an album not a single. However, the single manage to peak within the Top 20 on US Pop and US R&B airplay.

=== Critical reception ===
Stephen Thomas Erlewine from AllMusic complimented the song as "great". Larry Flick from Billboard magazine wrote that here, the group are "stretching out nicely over a cool midtempo groove, juiced with the same quasi-hip-hop/funk flavors that fueled 'Hold On' and 'My Lovin' (You're Never Gonna Get It)'." He felt that those "warm and distinctive harmonies feel like a welcome visit from an old friend, while multiple lead vocals are appropriately diva-like, without an overload of hype." Troy J. Augusto from Cash Box said it's a "comfortably groovin' song, seemingly familiar the first time you hear it, features all four Vogue'rs doing what they do best—melting hearts." He added, "Super confident vocals, En Vogue's bread and butter, will propel 'Runaway Love' to the top of all the appropriate charts and playlists. Don't miss this one." James Earl Hardy from Entertainment Weekly found that the song "prove [that] these divas have more in common with the Emotions and the Sweet Inspirations than with the Supremes."

Dave Sholin from the Gavin Report complimented the writers for continuing to "demonstrate their production genius". Another Gavin Report editor, Kelly Woo, called the song "a masterpiece of harmony and tight production that captures the energy of their earlier works. Their vocal performance is incomparable and uncompromising-perfection!" Push from Melody Maker wrote, "The limp swingbeat swivel of 'Runaway Love' [...] is drearier than watching Skelmersdale United take on Glossop Town on a wet Wednesday evening." Pan-European magazine Music & Media remarked that, with "one foot in history and the other one in the swingbeat era, these girls are moving closer to becoming the Pointer Sisters of our time." Ralph Tee from Music Week's RM Dance Update stated that the group "have never sounded sweeter than on this stylish, lilting two stepper with harmonies to send shivers down the spine." Another RM editor, James Hamilton, described it as a "funkily wukka-wukked mumbling and cooing slinky roller" in his weekly dance column. James Hunter from Vibe complimented the groove's "gorgeus skating harmonies".

== Formats and track listings ==
- US CD single
1. "Runaway Love" (hip hop vocal remix edit) – 4:10
2. "Runaway Love" (hip hop vocal remix edit w/o rap) – 4:10
3. "Runaway Love" (hip hop vocal remix) – 5:02
4. "Runaway Love" (Theo's Bad Intentions radio edit) – 4:48
5. "Runaway Love" (Theo's Bad Intentions club mix) – 7:06
- US CD single
1. "Runaway Love" (radio edit) – 4:06
2. "Runaway Love" (E.P. version) – 4:55
3. "Runaway Love" (extended version) – 5:35
4. "Runaway Love" (Hype mix) – 4:57
5. "Runaway Love" (FMob instrumental) – 4:51
- UK 7-inch single
1. "Runaway Love" (radio edit) – 4:16
2. "Runaway Love" (Hype mix) – 4:57
- UK CD single
1. "Runaway Love" (radio edit) – 4:06
2. "Runaway Love" (extended version) – 5:36
3. "What Is Love" (club mix) – 5:36
4. "Desire" (Dancehall remix) – 3:56

== Personnel ==
- Backing Vocals – Maxine Jones
- Guitar – Marlon McClain
- Lead Vocals, Backing Vocals – Cindy Herron, Dawn Robinson, Terry Ellis
- Keyboards, Drum Programming – Denzil Foster, Thomas McElroy
- Mixed, Engineer – Ken Kessie
- Production coordinator – Angela Skinner, Marie McElroy
- Producer, Executive-Producer – Thomas McElroy and Denzil Foster

== Charts ==
Chart (1993–1994)	Peak position
Australia (ARIA)	62
Canada Top Singles (RPM)	24
Canada Dance/Urban (RPM)	4
Europe (Eurochart Hot 100)	83
Europe (European Dance Radio)	9
Netherlands (Dutch Top 40 Tipparade)	11
Netherlands (Single Top 100)	46
UK Singles (Official Charts)	36
UK Airplay (ERA)	65
UK Dance (Music Week)	10
UK Club Chart (Music Week)	27
US Billboard Hot 100	51
US Dance Singles Sales (Billboard) with "What Is Love"	17
US Hot R&B/Hip-Hop Songs (Billboard)	15
US Pop Airplay (Billboard)	19
US Rhythmic Airplay (Billboard)	14
US Cash Box Top 100	43

== Release history ==
Region	Date	Format(s)	Label(s)	Ref.
United Kingdom	September 27, 1993	7-inch vinyl; 12-inch vinyl; CD; cassette	EastWest America	
Japan	October 25, 1993	Mini-CD	EastWest America	
Australia	November 8, 1993	CD; cassette	EastWest America	
