= Bristol24/7 =

Independent online newspaper for the city of Bristol

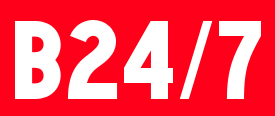
- Bristol 24/7 Logo
- Website type: News and information
- Available in: English
- Founded: 2009
- Headquarters: Bristol, {{{location_country}}}
- Founder: Christopher Brown
- Key people: Martin Booth (editor)
- Website: bristol247.com
- Registration: Optional
- Launched: 29 June 2009
- Current status: Active

Bristol24/7 is an independent online newspaper, generally branded as B24/7, offering news, comment and features for the city of Bristol. As of 2023, it had a print circulation of 20,000, with, on average, 250,000 unique monthly visitors to its website.

== History ==
Founded in 2009 by former The Independent and Western Daily Press journalist Christopher Brown, it was designed as an independent newspaper for Bristol. The following year, fellow Western Daily Press journalist Laura K Williams joined to launch a What's On section.

In 2011 it was voted EDF Energy South West Website of the Year. It retained this title in 2012. In June 2012, it received a commendation as Best Local News Website in the UK at the Online Media Awards.

Bristol24-7 was sold to Dougal Templeton and Mike Bennett and a new publication, Bristol24/7, was launched as a community interest company in 2014. Writers from the former Venue Magazine, Spark Magazine and online magazine Bristol Culture joined the company. Editor of Bristol Culture, Martin Booth, joined as co-editor of Bristol24/7 and became editor in November 2014.

In 2018, Bristol24/7 launched a membership model for individuals and businesses to help support their social impact projects. Bristol24/7 reached 1,000 individual supporter members in September 2024 and currently has a network of around 60 businesses in their Better Business community. Members are rewarded for their support with perks, including free pints of Bristol Beer Factory draught products, at businesses around the city.

Now based at Tobacco Factory, Raleigh Road, Bristol24/7 publishes content seven days a week from freelance journalists and bloggers from around the city. In 2023 Bristol24/7 was voted one of the top 100 social enterprises in the UK in the NatWest SE100 Index and was also shortlisted for Future Leap's sustainability award for communicating the climate emergency.

As a community interest company, Bristol24/7 runs projects with charities and community groups around Bristol to make the city a better place. They run projects around three core aims: amplifying marginalised voices, creating opportunities for young people and empowering environmental projects.

Sections include news, business, comment, what's on, food and drink, lifestyle and culture.
