= Too Gone, Too Long =

1997 single by En Vogue

Single by En Vogue

from the album EV3
- Released: August 19, 1997
- Length: 4:42
- Label: EastWest
- Songwriter: Diane Warren
- Producer: David Foster

En Vogue singles chronology
"Whatever" (1997)	"Too Gone, Too Long" (1997)	"No Fool, No More" (1998)

Music video
- "Too Gone, Too Long" on YouTube

"Too Gone, Too Long" is a song by American R&B vocal group En Vogue. Written by Diane Warren and produced by longtime collaborator David Foster, it was recorded for the group's third album, EV3 (1997). A power ballad that blends pop and contemporary R&B elements, it was selected as the album's third and final single and reached number 33 on the US Billboard Hot 100. It also peaked within the top 20 of the UK Singles Chart to become the group's final top-20 hit there.

== Background ==
"Too Gone, Too Long" was written by Diane Warren, while production was handled by frequent collaborator, Canadian record producer David Foster. Felipe Elgueta served as its engineer, while mixing was overseen Mick Guzauski, with John Moony assisting. Michael Thompson played the electric guitar and Dean Parks provided acoustic guitar riffs on the track; Simon Franglen was consulted as synclavier programmer. An adult contemporary power ballad, "Too Gone, Too Long" blends pop and contemporary R&B elements.

As with most on parent album EV3, "Too Gone, Too Long" marked a breakaway for En Vogue who had worked exclusively with their founders Foster & McElroy throughout most of their career. When the album was nearing completion, Dawn Robinson chose to leave the group in April 1997 for a solo recording contract with Dr. Dre's Aftermath Records after difficult contractual negotiations reached a stalemate. Her abrupt departure from the band forced the remaining trio Terry Ellis, Cindy Herron, and Maxine Jones to record additional vocals to replace Robinson's lead vocals.

== Critical reception ==
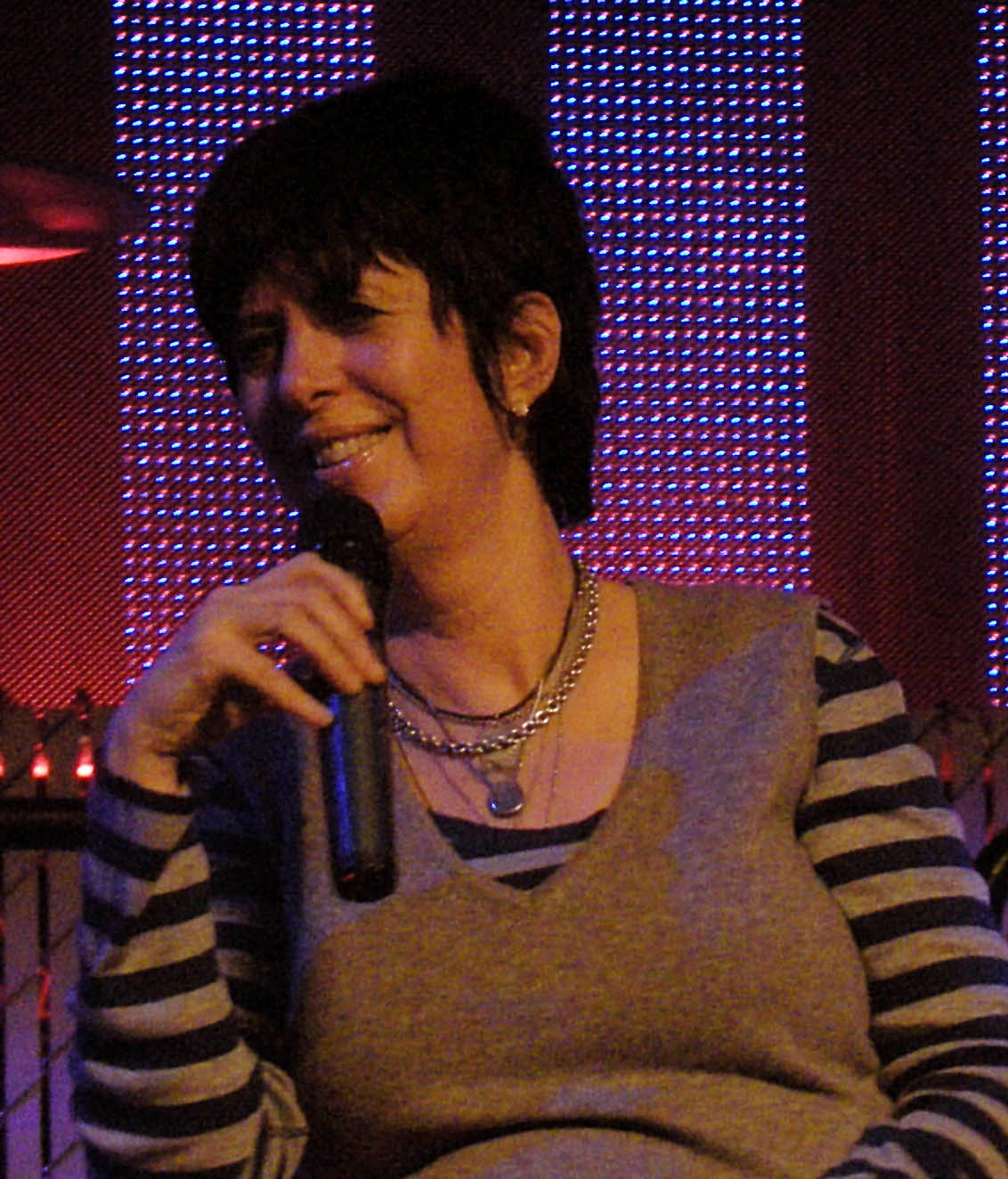
En Vogue's decision to record a Diane Warren (pictured) record divided music critics.

"Too Gone, Too Long" received generally mixed reviews from music critics. Los Angeles Times writer Connie Johnson ranked the song among the album's highlights and noted it as "an integral part of the womanly, more mature stance" of its parent album". She added: "The group smokes Diane Warren's "Too Gone Too Long," the kind of power ballad that has catapulted the careers of Celine Dion and Toni Braxton to a higher level. That the funky divas can sing has always been a given, but this is a performance upon which musical reps are truly built." Opposed to this, Stephen Leo Stanley from AllMusic was critical of the band's decision to work with Warren and Foster on "Too Gone, Too Long". He found that the pair reshaped "En Vogue as an adult contemporary band, sapping the group of any of their energy or style." Gerald Martinez from New Straits Times called the song a "brooding ballad". Elysa Gardner from Rolling Stone described the song as "sweetly wistful" and added that "a persistent cad receives this simple message: "The door is locked/You can't get in." You go, girls." Laura Jamison from Salon Magazine noted it as "a predictably well-crafted ballad", adding that "it's sure to be a hit".

== Commercial performance ==
Released as the third and final from EV3, "Too Gone, Too Long" reached number 33 on the US Billboard Hot 100 and number 25 on the Hot R&B Singles chart. A moderate success in the United States, it became one of the band's lowest-charting singles by then, though it remains En Vogue's final single to reach the top forty on the Billboard Hot 100 to date. Similarly, the song became the group's seventh and final top twenty entry in the United Kingdom when it debuted and peaked at number twenty on the UK Singles Chart in 1997. Elsewhere, "Too Gone, Too Long" reached the top forty of the New Zealand Singles Chart and peaked at number 45 on the Single Top 100 chart in the Netherlands.

== Music video ==
An accompanying music video "Too Gone, Too Long" was directed by Francis Lawrence.

== Track listing ==
UK CD single
No.	Title	Writer(s)	Producer(s)	Length
1.	"Too Gone, Too Long"	Diane Warren	David Foster	4:08
2.	"It's About Love"	Terry Ellis; Cindy Herron; Dawn Robinson; Maxine Jones; Ivan Matias; James Gass; Brion James	Andrea Martin; Matias	4:12
3.	"Whatever" (Roni's Searching For A New Key Mix)	Kenneth Edmonds; Keith Andes; Giuliano Franco	Babyface; Franco^{[a]}; Roni Size^{[b]}	7:01
4.	"Whatever" (Tuff Jam 2 In 1 Remix)	Edmonds; Andes; Franco	Babyface; Franco^{[a]}; Karl Brown; Matt Lamont^{[b]}	7:58

US CD single
No.	Title	Writer(s)	Producer(s)	Length
1.	"Too Gone, Too Long"	Warren	David Foster	4:08
2.	"Eyes of a Child"	Denzil Foster; Thomas McElroy	Foster & McElroy	4:31

Notes

- ^{^[a]} denotes co-producer(s)
- ^{^[b]} denotes additional producer(s)

== Personnel ==
Personnel are adapted from the liner notes of EV3.

- Felipe Elgueta – engineer
- Terry Ellis – lead vocals
- David Foster – Producer, arranger and keyboards
- Simon Franglen – synclavier programming
- Mick Guzauski – mixing engineer
- Cindy Herron – lead vocals
- Maxine Jones – lead vocals
- John Moony – assistant engineer
- Dean Parks – acoustic guitar
- Dawn Robinson – background vocals
- Michael Thompson – electric guitar
- Diane Warren – composer

== Charts ==
=== Weekly charts ===
Chart (1997)	Peak position
Australia (ARIA)	134
Israel (Israeli Singles Chart)	25
Netherlands (Dutch Top 40 Tipparade)	2
Netherlands (Single Top 100)	45
New Zealand (Recorded Music NZ)	39
Scottish Singles Sales (Official Charts)	37
UK Singles (Official Charts)	20
UK Dance (Official Charts)	4
UK Hip Hop/R&B (Official Charts)	7
US Billboard Hot 100	33
US Hot R&B/Hip-Hop Songs (Billboard)	25
US Pop Airplay (Billboard)	26
US Rhythmic Airplay (Billboard)	21

=== Year-end charts ===
Chart (1997)	Position
Romania (Romanian Top 100)	76
US Top 40/Mainstream (Billboard)	92

== Release history ==
Region	Date	Format(s)	Label(s)	Ref.
United States	August 19, 1997	Contemporary hit radio	EastWest	
United Kingdom	August 25, 1997	12-inch vinyl; CD; cassette	EastWest	
Japan	September 10, 1997	CD	EastWest	
