= Whatever (En Vogue song) =

1997 single by En Vogue

Single by En Vogue

from the album EV3
- B-side: "It's About Love"
- Released: June 2, 1997
- Genre: Funk
- Length: 4:22
- Label: EastWest
- Songwriters: Kenneth Edmonds; Keith Andes; Giuliano Franco
- Producer: Babyface

En Vogue singles chronology
"Don't Let Go (Love)" (1996)	"Whatever" (1997)	"Too Gone, Too Long" (1997)

Music video
- "Whatever" on YouTube

"Whatever" is a song by American female vocal group En Vogue. It was written by Kenneth "Babyface" Edmonds, Keith Andes, and Giuliano Franco for the group’s third studio album, EV3 (1997), while production was helmed by Edmonds, featuring additional production by Franco. Selected and released as the album's second single, it was the final single from EV3 to precede the release of its parent album. "Whatever" reached the top 10 in Canada and on the US Billboard Hot R&B Singles chart while peaking within the top 20 in Finland, the United Kingdom, and on the Billboard Hot 100. The accompanying music video was directed by Matthew Rolston. "Whatever" was certified gold by the Recording Industry Association of America (RIAA) for shipments of over 500,000 units.

== Background ==
"Whatever" was written by Kenneth "Babyface" Edmonds, Keith Andes, and Giuliano Franco, while production was overseen by Edmonds. Franco served as a co-producer on the song. As with most on EV3, "Whatever" marked a breakaway for En Vogue who had worked exclusively with their founders Foster & McElroy throughout most of their career. As the album was nearing completion, Former member Dawn Robinson chose to leave the group in April 1997 for a solo recording contract with Dr. Dre's Aftermath Records after difficult contractual negotiations reached a stalemate. Her abrupt departure from the band forced the remaining trio to re-record several of her original lead vocals; however, not every track was re-recorded, with Robinson's backing vocals remaining intact on "Whatever".

== Critical reception ==
AllMusic editor Leo Stanley noted that on the track, Babyface is "funkier than [on] his previous work". Larry Flick from Billboard magazine described it as a "slap-happy funk throw-down that elevates them miles above the glut of new-jill girl groups they've inspired." He remarked that "despite being reduced to a trio, the act doesn't miss a note vocally. Their harmonies remain distinctive and lush, thanks in large part to the savvy production of Babyface and Giuliano Franco. They dress the act in immediately insinuating beats, ear-grabbing keyboard loops, and guitar licks." J.D. Considine for Entertainment Weekly felt the lyrics to "Whatever" "depict a state of frustrated desire". A reviewer from Music Week rated it three out of five, viewing it as a "less instant, more downtempo funky groove". The magazine's Alan Jones complimented it as "a sweet jillswing groove that benefits from increasingly complex vocal interplay as it unfolds. It is unlikely to make the same kind of impression as Don't Let Go (Love), but will still be a big hit in the UK."

Gerald Martinez from New Straits Times declared "Whatever" as a "midtempo and funky tune with a catchy chorus." John Mulvey from NME stated that it "retains a frankly terrifying power", noting "the sprung minimalism". Laura Jamison from Salon Magazine said that Babyface is "concocting a pop song jammed with hooks that don't require profound emotion – perfect for En Vogue. These women can all sing, so when they get an opportunity to wail, they sound great." Ann Powers from Spin wrote that "stroking their tender buttons" in the song, En Vogue "bring it all back to the basics of gorgeous harmonies and mind-boggling vocal riffs." She also added Babyface transforming the background vocals of the track "into android-precise sonic effects that bring out the eeriness in En Vogue's flawless form." Ian Hyland from Sunday Mirror stated that the hit singles "Whatever" and "Don't Let Go (Love)" may well be brilliant but they only add more spice to a mighty fine collection."

== Music video ==
The horror movie-inspired music video for "Whatever", directed by Matthew Rolston, features the girls and the doctors disguised as zombies in a modern beauty salon with "Thriller-esque hair and makeup". They are surrounded by doctors and nurses dressed in orange outfits performing various surgical procedures. Cindy Herron is shown pulling a face statue in a lightning filled hallway, while she begins the song covering up her face with a mask then removing to sing the first verse, replacing it back after the song's last hook. Maxine Jones is seen singing in front of a three-way mirror in a blue dress. Terry Ellis sings in ghostly-hued, zombie-like makeup while wearing a beauty micrometer as a doctor attends to her. Several beauty enhancement procedures are shown in the video – face lifts, breast augmentation, even skin bleaching. According to Vibe, the video was "not warmly received."

== Track listings ==
The Tumblin' Dice remix of "Whatever" features a rap from Ol' Dirty Bastard while the 2000 Watts remix of "Don't Let Go (Love)" features Rah Digga. The Tumblin' Dice remix contains a sample of "Funk You Up" by the Sequence. The Mucho Soul mix of "Whatever" contains Robinson's original verse (which Herron sings on the final version) and her original "whatevers" on the outro (which Ellis sings on the final version).

- US CD and cassette single
1. "Whatever" (radio version) – 4:11
2. "It's About Love" – 5:10
- US maxi-CD single
1. "Whatever" (album version) – 4:22
2. "Whatever" (The Tumblin' Dice remix – extended club remix) – 5:43
3. "Whatever" (The Tumblin' Dice Remix – radio remix w/o rap) – 4:15
4. "It's About Love" – 5:10
5. "Whatever" (album instrumental) – 4:22
6. "Whatever" (The Tumblin' Dice remix instrumental) – 4:16
- US 12-inch single

A1. "Whatever" (album version) – 4:22
A2. "Whatever" (instrumental) – 4:22
A3. "Whatever" (radio edit) – 4:09
A4. "It's About Love" – 5:10
B1. "Whatever" (The Tumblin' Dice remix – extended club remix) – 5:43
B2. "Whatever" (The Tumblin' Dice Remix – radio remix w/o rap) – 4:15
B3. "Whatever" (The Tumblin' Dice remix instrumental) – 4:16
B4. "Whatever" (acappella) – 4:16

- US 12-inch single (The Dance Remixes)

A1. "Whatever" (Mucho Soul mix) – 6:27
A2. "Whatever" (Shelter dub) – 6:35
B1. "Whatever" (Tuff Jam's Unda-Vybe dub) – 6:55
B2. "Whatever" (Tuff Jam's 2 in 1 instrumental) – 8:05

- UK CD and 12-inch single
1. "Whatever" (radio edit) – 4:11
2. "Whatever" (Mousse T. radio mix) – 4:00
3. "Whatever" (LP version) – 4:22
4. "Whatever" (Lemon D. remix) – 8:40
5. "Whatever" (The Tumblin' Dice radio remix) – 4:16
- UK cassette single
1. "Whatever" (radio edit) – 4:11
2. "Whatever" (Mousse T. radio edit) – 5:11
- European CD single
1. "Whatever" (radio edit) – 4:11
2. "Whatever" (Mousse T. radio mix) – 4:00
3. "Whatever" (The Tumblin' Dice radio remix) – 4:16
- Australian CD single
1. "Whatever" (LP version)
2. "Whatever" (radio edit)
3. "Whatever" (instrumental)
4. "Whatever" (TV track)
- Japanese CD single
1. "Whatever" (LP version)
2. "Whatever" (The Tumblin' Dice remix – extended club remix)
3. "Don't Let Go (Love)" (LP version)
4. "Don't Let Go (Love)" (2000 Watts remix)

== Credits ==
- Co-production – Giuliano Franco
- Production – Babyface
- Guitar – Mark Coleman
- Programmed by Randy Walker
- Engineered and mixed by Manny Marroquin
- Produced for ECAF Productions, Inc.
- Recorded at Brandon's Way Recording
- Mixed at Brandon's Way Recording

== Charts ==
=== Weekly charts ===
Chart (1997)	Peak position
Australia (ARIA)	77
Belgium (Ultratip Bubbling Under Flanders)	17
Canada Top Singles (RPM)	8
Canada Dance/Urban (RPM)	4
Europe (Eurochart Hot 100)	95
Finland (Suomen virallinen lista)	12
Germany (GfK)	92
Israel (Israeli Singles Chart)	30
Netherlands (Dutch Top 40)	22
Netherlands (Single Top 100)	63
New Zealand (Recorded Music NZ)	24
Scottish Singles Sales (Official Charts)	28
UK Singles (Official Charts)	14
UK Dance (Official Charts)	5
UK Hip Hop/R&B (Official Charts)	4
US Billboard Hot 100	16
US Dance Club Songs (Billboard)	5
US Dance Singles Sales (Billboard)	6
US Hot R&B/Hip-Hop Songs (Billboard)	8
US Pop Airplay (Billboard)	17
US Rhythmic Airplay (Billboard)	6

=== Year-end charts ===
Chart (1997)	Position
Canada Top Singles (RPM)	69
Canada Dance/Urban (RPM)	50
UK Urban (Music Week)	21
US Hot R&B Singles (Billboard)	87
US Rhythmic Top 40 (Billboard)	43
US Top 40/Mainstream (Billboard)	79

== Certifications ==
Region	Certification	Certified units/sales
United States (RIAA)	Gold	500,000^{^}
^{^} Shipments figures based on certification alone.

== Release history ==
Region	Date	Format(s)	Label(s)	Ref.
United States	May 20, 1997	Rhythmic contemporary; contemporary hit radio	EastWest	
United Kingdom	June 2, 1997	12-inch vinyl; CD; cassette	EastWest	
Japan	June 10, 1997	CD	EastWest	
United States	July 1997	12-inch vinyl; CD; cassette	EastWest	
