= En Vogue =

American vocal girl group

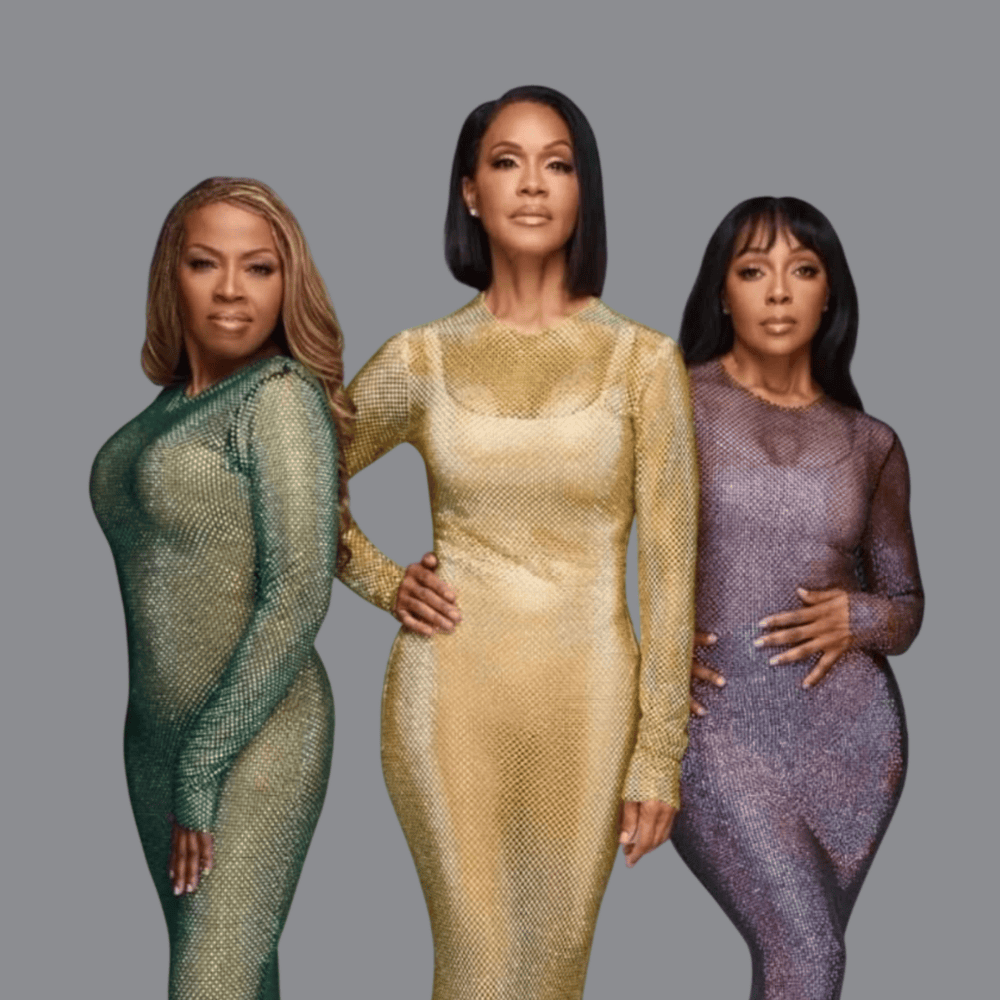
- En Vogue in 2025 (L–R): Maxine Jones, Cindy Herron, and Terry Ellis

Background information
- Origin: Oakland, California, U.S.
- Genres: R&B; soul; funk; new jack swing; pop; hip-hop; dance
- Works: En Vogue discography
- Years active: 1989–present
- Labels: Atlantic; EastWest; Elektra; Discretion; 33rd Street; Pyramid; Entertainment One Music
- Members: Terry Ellis; Cindy Herron; Maxine Jones
- Past members: Dawn Robinson; Amanda Cole; Rhona Bennett
- Website: envoguemusic.com

En Vogue is an American girl group whose original lineup consisted of singers Terry Ellis, Dawn Robinson, Cindy Herron, and Maxine Jones. Formed in Oakland, California, in 1989, En Vogue reached No. 2 on the US Hot 100 with the single "Hold On", taken from their 1990 debut album Born to Sing. The group's 1992 follow-up album Funky Divas reached the top 10 in both the US and UK, and included their second US No. 2 hit "My Lovin' (You're Never Gonna Get It)" as well as the US top-10 hits "Giving Him Something He Can Feel" and "Free Your Mind".

In 1996, "Don't Let Go (Love)" became the group's third, and most successful, single to reach No. 2 in the US, and became their sixth No. 1 on the US R&B chart. Scoring more No. 1 singles on the US R&B chart than any other female group other than the Supremes. Robinson left the group in 1997 shortly before the release of their third album EV3, which reached the US and UK top 10. Jones left the group in 2001, and Amanda Cole joined shortly thereafter. However, in 2003, Cole left the group, and Rhona Bennett joined the group during the recording of their album Soul Flower. In 2005, the original members briefly united before disassembling again. In 2009, the original members once again reunited for their "En Vogue: 20th Anniversary". Shortly after the tour, Robinson and Jones again departed from En Vogue, with Bennett rejoining the group as a trio.

En Vogue has sold 20 million records worldwide. The group has won seven MTV Video Music Awards, three Soul Train Awards, two American Music Awards, and received seven Grammy nominations. They are the first and only female group to be awarded the Sammy Davis Jr. Award for Entertainer of the Year. In December 1999, Billboard magazine ranked the band as the 19th most successful recording artist of the 1990s. They ranked as the second most successful female group of the 1990s. In March 2015, Billboard magazine named the group the ninth most-successful girl group of all time. Two of the group's singles ranks in Billboard's most successful girl group songs of all-time list, "Don't Let Go (Love)" (No. 12) and "Hold On" (No. 23). Billboard lists them as the third most successful female R&B group of the past 25 years, after TLC and Destiny's Child and seventh most successful group overall.

== History ==
=== 1989–1991: Formation and Born to Sing ===
In the late 1980s, when they were assembling their 1989 compilation project FM2 for Atlantic Records, Oakland-based production and songwriting duo Denzil Foster and Thomas McElroy first conceived the idea of a modern-day girl group in the tradition of commercially successful female bands that flourished in the late 1950s and early 1960s. Foster and McElroy envisioned an entertainment unit with interchangeable but not identical parts in which every member would qualify to take the lead vocals on any given number. Thus, their plan was to recruit singers who possessed strong voices, noticeably good looks, and intelligence. Approximately 3,000 women attended the auditions held in 1988, with Dawn Robinson, Cindy Herron, and Maxine Jones making the final cut. Conceived as a trio, Foster and McElroy decided to create a quartet after hearing the audition of Terry Ellis whose plane had been late from Houston, Texas. At first, they selected the band name 4-U but soon shifted to Vogue, ultimately settling on En Vogue, upon learning that another group had already claimed the Vogue name.

After forming, the group began working with their producers on their debut album. Recording began in August 1989 and wrapped up in December of the same year. Born to Sing was released on April 3, 1990. The album peaked at No. 21 on the Billboard 200 chart and No. 3 on Billboard's R&B Albums Chart. The first single, "Hold On", was released to radio in late February 1990 and became a crossover pop hit, reaching No. 2 on the Billboard Hot 100 singles chart, and No. 1 on both the R&B singles and Hot Dance Music/Club Play chart. It later went to No. 5 in the UK and became a hit in Europe. The next two singles, "Lies" and "You Don't Have to Worry", each went to No. 1 on the Billboard R&B chart, while the fourth and final single, "Don't Go", charted at No. 3 on the Billboard R&B chart. The album was later certified platinum by the RIAA.

"Hold On" was awarded a Billboard Music Award for No. 1 R&B Single of the Year, a Soul Train Award for R&B/Urban Contemporary Single of the Year, Group, Band or Duo and were nominated for a Grammy Award for Best R&B Vocal Performance by a Duo or Group. In 1990, En Vogue signed an endorsement deal to appear in a Diet Coke commercial directed by Spike Lee.

=== 1992–1994: Funky Divas, Runaway Love and touring ===
En Vogue's second album, Funky Divas, was released in the spring of 1992. The album debuted at No. 8 on the Billboard 200 and No. 1 on the Billboard Top R&B/Hip-Hop Albums chart and ultimately doubled the take of its predecessor, going triple platinum. The album's first two singles: "My Lovin' (You're Never Gonna Get It)" and "Giving Him Something He Can Feel" both went top 10 and peaked at No. 1 on the R&B chart. The next single, "Free Your Mind" also went top 10. The final two singles, "Give It Up Turn It Loose" and "Love Don't Love You", were both top-40 hits. The album went on to sell more than five million copies, won an American Music Award for Favorite Soul/R&B Album, and was nominated for five Grammy Awards. The music video for "Free Your Mind" earned the group three MTV Video Music Awards for Best Choreography, Best Dance Video, and Best R&B Video. They were honored with Soul Train's Entertainer of the Year Award. In addition to this, the group was featured in Rolling Stone, Entertainment Weekly, and Essence, and other major publications. Riding on success of Funky Divas, a six-song EP titled Runaway Love was released in the fall of 1993, spawning the hit "Runaway Love".

The group was signed to an endorsement deal with Converse, and was featured as an opening act on Luther Vandross' 1993 "Never Let Me Go" Tour. England, Germany, the Netherlands, and France were among the numerous countries toured. However, according to an article in Vibe magazine, Vandross (by his own admission in interviews) and his entourage clashed with the members of En Vogue during the tour, and he vowed never to work with them again. En Vogue made numerous television appearances on such series as In Living Color, A Different World, Roc and Hangin' with Mr. Cooper (the latter two in which they also sang the shows' theme songs). In 1993, En Vogue was featured on Salt-N-Pepa's top-10 hit "Whatta Man", from Salt-N-Pepa's album Very Necessary. The track appeared (slightly edited) on En Vogue's Runaway Love EP.

=== 1995–1999: The departure of Robinson and EV3 ===
In 1995, En Vogue was among numerous African American female vocalists featured on the song "Freedom" for the soundtrack to Mario Van Peebles's film Panther (1995). Also in 1995, while band members Cindy Herron and Maxine Jones went on maternity leave, Ellis recorded and released a solo album titled Southern Gal, which spun off the top 10 R&B single "Where Ever You Are". The same year, the band made a cameo appearance in Joel Schumacher's superhero film Batman Forever. In 1996, En Vogue recorded "Don't Let Go (Love)" for the soundtrack to the motion picture Set It Off. Released as the soundtrack's lead single in the fall 1996, it became the group's biggest hit yet, selling over 1.8 million copies worldwide and becoming certified platinum by the RIAA. In response to the large commercial success of "Don't Let Go (Love)", the group worked on their third studio album. As the album was nearing completion, Robinson chose to leave the group in March 1997 after contractual negotiations reached a stalemate. Despite Robinson's abrupt departure, Ellis, Herron, and Jones continued on as a trio.

Following Robinson's departure from the group, the remaining trio re-recorded several of her original lead vocals for their forthcoming album EV3, released in June 1997. A breakaway from previous projects, it marked En Vogue's first project to include a diverse roster of collaborators including credits from Babyface, David Foster, Diane Warren, Andrea Martin, and Ivan Matias along with regular contributors Foster and McElroy. Upon its release, EV3 received mixed reviews from critics, many of whom praised the band's vocal performances but were critical with overall production of the album. In the U.S., it debuted at No. 8 on both Billboard's Top R&B/Hip-Hop Albums chart and the Billboard 200 with sales of 76,500 units, the band's highest first-week numbers. Two further singles released from the album, "Whatever" and "Too Gone, Too Long", entered the top 20 and top 40 the Billboard Hot 100, respectively.

In 1998, En Vogue recorded the song "No Fool No More" for the soundtrack to the film Why Do Fools Fall in Love (1998). A top 40 entry on the New Zealand Singles Chart, it was later included on the band's first compilation album Best of En Vogue, released in June 1999. A moderate success, the album reached the top 40 in Austria and the United Kingdom.

=== 2000–2004: Masterpiece Theatre and new member ===
Masterpiece Theatre, the group's fourth studio album, was released in May 2000. Their first project with Elektra Records, the trio worked exclusively with their founders on the album who made heavy use of samples from classical music and traditional pop music to construct songs for recording. Preceded by leading single "Riddle", the album received a mixed reception from critics upon its release, who were divided by its overall sound, and became a commercial disappointment, reaching No. 33 on the Top R&B/Hip-Hop Albums chart and No. 67 on the US Billboard 200 only. While Masterpiece Theatre and "Riddle" fared better in international territories, its poor performance resulted in the release of no further singles from the album and the band was soon dropped from the Elektra company.

In 2001, Jones had announced her desire to spend more time with her daughter and departed the group. With Ellis and Herron wanting to continue performing En Vogue, singer-songwriter Amanda Cole joined as a performing member after submitting a demo. The following year, Ellis, Herron, and Cole collaborated with Timothy Eaton on the holiday album The Gift of Christmas, featuring four original songs and eight cover versions of Christmas standards and carols. Released in fall 2002 through Discretion Records, it failed to chart. In December 2002, the trio gave a concert at the Alabama State Fairgrounds in Birmingham, Alabama which was recorded and released, along with bonus footage, on a DVD and live album through Charly Records in 2004. Cole, who felt increasingly limited vocally and creatively, decided to leave the band in favor of a solo career soon after, with singer and actress Rhona Bennett joining after being recommended to Denzel Foster through a mutual friend and songwriting partner.

=== 2004–2008: Soul Flower and impromptu reunion ===
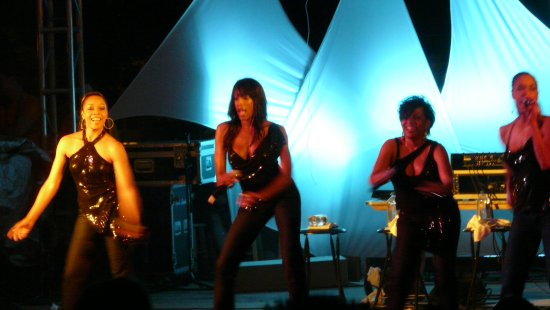
A lineup of Ellis, Bennett, Jones, and Herron performing in 2008

With Bennett, the trio began work on their sixth album Soul Flower. Produced by Ellis and Herron, it was made independently through their own label Funkigirl Records as well as Foster and McElory's 33rd Street Records, and distribution was handled through an outside deal with Bayside Entertainment. Released to mixed reviews from critics, who noted its mellower tone, the album failed to chart on the Billboard 200, but reached No. 47 on the Top R&B/Hip-Hop Albums and No. 15 on the Independent Albums charts. Its two singles, "Losin' My Mind" and "Ooh Boy", reached the top 40 on Billboard's Adult R&B Songs chart. During the latter part of 2004, En Vogue traveled three months in Europe as part of the Night of the Proms concerts series, with Jones rejoining the group to fill the place of Herron, who went on maternity leave. The Ellis/Bennett/Jones performing incarnation of the group headlined Lifetime's fifth annual WomenRock! alongside Blondie, Angie Stone, and several others. Performing several of their hits, co-headliner Kelly Clarkson joined them for a rendition of "Free Your Mind."

In 2005, Herron and Robinson rejoined En Vogue, and Bennett withdrew from the group. The original four signed with one of the industry's largest management firms, the Firm Management Group, and began soliciting material for a new studio album which was expected to be released through Los Angeles-based Movemakers and Funkigirl Records. That September, the band joined Salt-N-Pepa for their first joint public performance of their 1994 single "Whatta Man" at VH1 Hip Hop Honors, and briefly toured together. The quartet also collaborated with Stevie Wonder and Prince on the backing vocals and music video for "So What the Fuss" from Wonder's 2005 A Time to Love album, which received a Grammy nomination at the 48th award ceremony in 2006.

After failing to agree on business terms, Robinson once again chose to defect from En Vogue, and Bennett returned to complete the quartet. As a result, En Vogue was let go from the Firm and an album full of new original material did not materialize. En Vogue continued to perform with Ellis, Herron, Jones, and Bennett on selected spot dates in North America, Europe, and Japan. During this time, they teamed with Flemish singer Natalia Druyts on a remix version of her song "Glamorous" which featured lead vocals by Bennett. Released as the second single from Druyts's third studio-album Everything and More (2007), it reached No. 2 on the Ultratop 50 of the Flemish region of Belgium and launched the six-part Natalia Meets En Vogue feat. Shaggy concert series at the Antwerps Sportpaleis in January 2008.

=== 2008–2015: Robinson's return and lawsuits ===
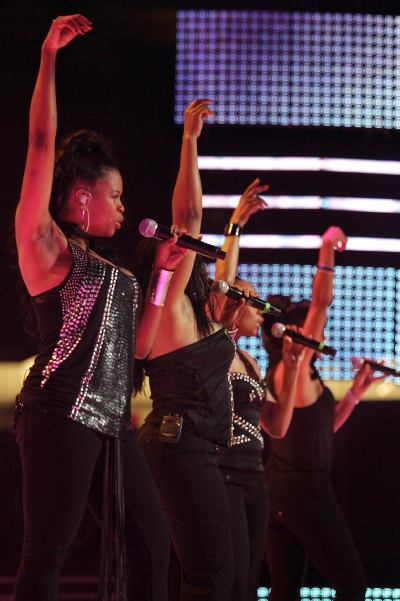
En Vogue performing during the Essence Music Festival in 2009.

On June 24, 2008, the original lineup of En Vogue appeared on the BET Awards, where they performed a medley with Alicia Keys, SWV and TLC as a tribute to girl groups of the 1990s. Complimented by the media, who declared their performance one of the evening's highlights, and with people buzzing about the industry return of the original band, the quartet talked about being united on a permanent basis. In August, after performing during selected spot dates, the original members announced their reformation for their 20th Anniversary World Tour which coincided with the release of their debut album Born to Sing (1990) and led them to tour North America, Europe and Japan. In 2009, En Vogue along with singers Beyoncé, John Legend, and Ne-Yo, performed at the Essence Music Festival, held at the Louisiana Superdome in New Orleans.

Again, new material with Robinson failed to materialize, and in 2010, Herron, Ellis, and Jones signed with René Moore's Rufftown Records in a deal that was to include two albums and touring. While the trio finished several songs for a new album, including promotional single "I'll Cry Later" which was sent to select urban adult contemporary radio stations on September 26, 2011, the comeback stalled and Jones left the band once more. In August 2012, Jones and Robinson announced that they would potentially record a group album together under the name Heirs to the Throne. While Herron and Ellis continued to tour as En Vogue along with a rejoined Bennett, Jones and Robinson added singer Shaunté Usual to their lineup. However, in 2013, Robinson chose not to begin a new group with her former band member and instead joined the cast of the TV One reality show R&B Divas: Los Angeles. Meanwhile, Jones began touring with singers Alison Carney and Maria Freeman as her new lineup of En Vogue, titled En Vogue to the Max. Jones later lost the right to use the En Vogue name after Herron and Ellis had filed suit against her for unauthorized use of the name, and a judge ruled that Herron and Ellis, as holders of the group's LLC, had exclusive rights to the group's name. Jones went solo and began recording her own original material, releasing her debut single "Didn't I" and a new ballad version of the En Vogue hit "Don't Let Go (Love)" with Australian singer Greg Gould.

In July 2014, Bennett, Ellis, and Herron signed a new contract with Pyramid Records and began work on the album Electric Café with mentors Denzil Foster and Thomas McElroy. In November, the trio appeared on the Lifetime holiday film An En Vogue Christmas in which they played fictional versions of themselves, reuniting to perform a benefit concert to save the nightclub where they got their start. The original movie featured En Vogue's hit singles as well as two new tracks and a rendition of "O Holy Night", later released digitally through En Vogue Records. In February 2015, Rufftown sued Ellis and Herron for over US $300 million, claiming the duo violated an exclusive recording contract by signing with Pyramid, alleging breach of contract, negligence, interference and fraud. Settled out of court, it resulted in the release of the extended play Rufftown Presents En Vogue in April 2015, which contained four songs recorded during their time with Rufftown, including "I'll Cry Later".

=== 2016–2021: Electric Café and touring ===
In 2016, En Vogue released "Deja Vu," the first promotional single from Electric Café, through their own label En Vogue Records after signing with Entertainment One Music. The following year, they embarked on the For the Love of Music Tour. The European tour launched on April 6, 2017 in Dublin, Ireland and concluded in Bremen, Germany on April 25. Also in 2017, the trio released three further singles from their forthcoming effort, including buzz singles "I'm Good" and "Have a Seat" featuring Snoop Dogg as well as Ne-Yo-penned lead single "Rocket", the latter of which became their first top 10 hit on Billboard's Adult R&B Songs chart in over 20 years.

In April 2018, En Vogue began the second leg of their European Tour in support of their seventh full-length studio album Electric Café. The same month, the album, their first studio project in 14 years, was released. A blend of neo soul, pop, and contemporary R&B with electronic dance music, the trio worked with Raphael Saadiq, Dem Jointz, Curtis "Sauce" Wilson as well as regular contributors Foster & McElroy on most of the album. Electric Café received mixed reviews from critics, many of whom praised the band for their vocal performances but found the material too generic and uneven. In the United States, the album debuted at No. 14 on Billboard's Independent Albums and reached the Top Album Sales chart. A second and final single from the album, "Reach 4 Me" became a top 20 hit on US Adult R&B Songs Chart in August 2018.

In July 2019, the group performed on the song "I Got You (Always and Forever)" alongside Chance the Rapper, Kierra Sheard, and Ari Lennox on the rapper's album The Big Day. In October 2019, original members Robinson and Jones reunited with Ellis, Herron, and Bennett for an on-stage performance to salute music industry executive Sylvia Rhone at the City of Hope Gala 2019, marking the first time all five members performed together. Plans to reunite permanently for another concert tour in support of their 30th anniversary in 2020, failed to materialize when the four original members could not agree on whether Bennett should once again step down as a non-original member.

In October 2020, the trio of Ellis, Herron, and Bennett closed out the 2020 Billboard Music Awards, performing "Free Your Mind". The following year, the group made a cameo in the romantic comedy sequel Coming 2 America alongside Salt-N-Pepa.

=== 2022–present: The Masked Singer and further touring ===
In 2022, En Vogue competed in season seven of The Masked Singer as the "Queen Cobras" of Team Bad. The trio narrowly missed out on a spot in the finale of the singing competition as they were eliminated on the week of May 4 alongside Shaggy as "Space Bunny" of Team Cuddly. The same year, the band embarked on the Mixtape Tour alongside New Kids on the Block, Salt-N-Pepa, and Rick Astley.

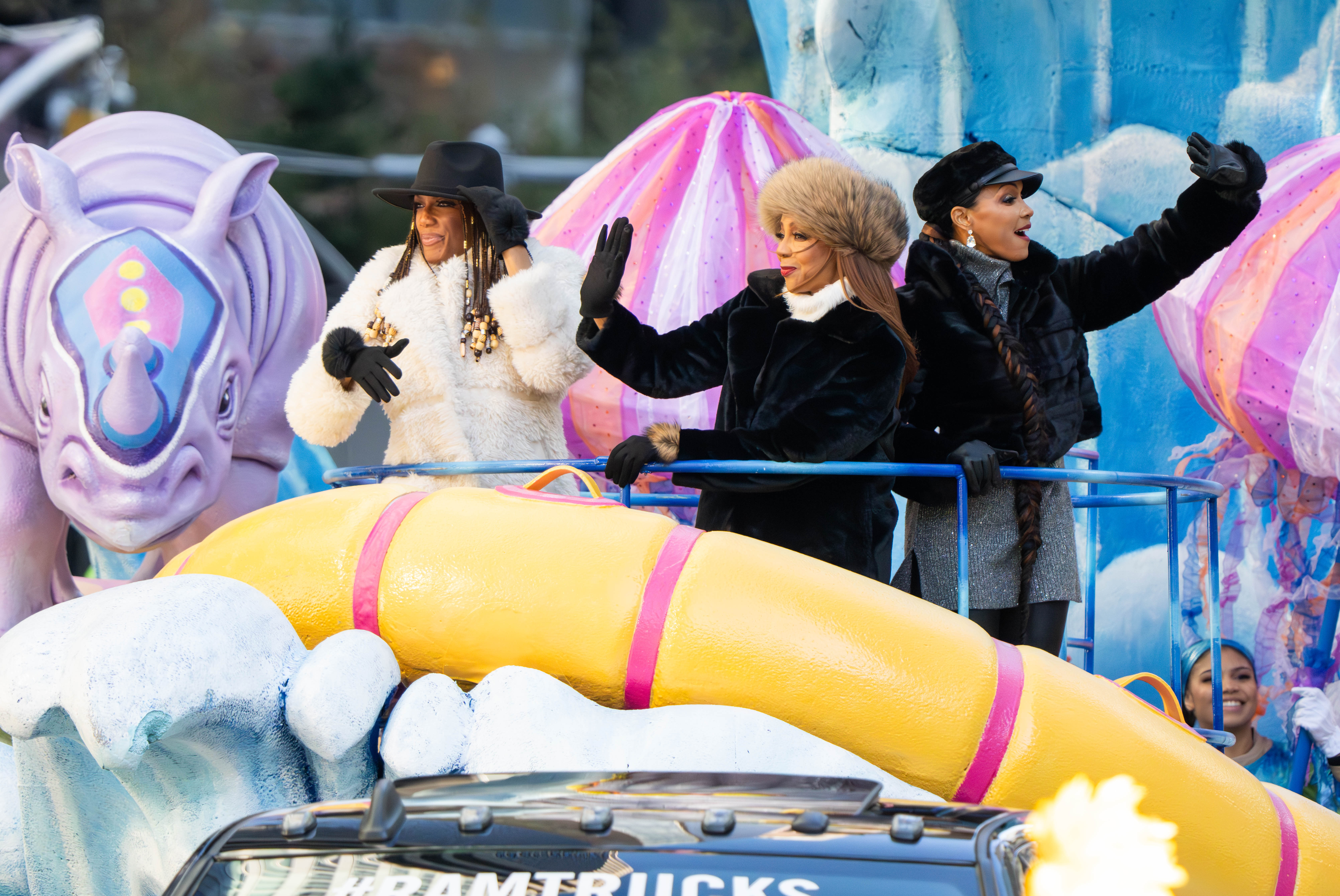
Bennett, Ellis, and Herron at Macy's Thanksgiving Day Parade in 2023.

In the summer of 2023, En Vogue joined TLC and Shaggy on the Hot Summer Nights tour, and performed as the headlining pop group for the 2023 Boston Pops Orchestra Fireworks Spectacular on July 4, 2023. Later that year, they performed "Free Your Mind" in the Macy's Thanksgiving Day Parade.

In May and June 2024, the group returned to London, England for the first time since 2018 for performances at the Cross the Tracks and Mighty Hoopla 2024 festivals, also performing at summer festivals in the United States and in CNN's "The Fourth in America" in July.

In February 2025, En Vogue performed at the NBA All-Star Game 2025 halftime show alongside music acts E-40, Too Short, Saweetie and DJ Cassidy, with former member Maxine Jones rejoining the group. Jones joined the band on their European Tour which kicked off on June 18 in Antwerp and concluded on July 6 in East Sussex, including a performance at Glastonbury Festival in Somerset. In November 2025, Bennett announced her departure from the group after being left out the Rock and Roll Hall of Fame performance with Salt-N-Pepa.

== Members ==
Current members
- Terry Ellis (1989–present)
- Cindy Herron (1989–present)
- Maxine Jones (1989–2001; 2003–2012, 2025–present)

Former members

- Dawn Robinson (1989–1997; 2005; 2008–2011)
- Amanda Cole (2001–2003)
- Rhona Bennett (2003–2005; 2006–2008; 2012–2025)

== Discography ==
Studio albums

- Born to Sing (1990)
- Funky Divas (1992)
- EV3 (1997)
- Masterpiece Theatre (2000)
- The Gift of Christmas (2002)
- Soul Flower (2004)
- Electric Café (2018)

== Tours ==
Headlining

- EV3 Tour (1997)
- En Vogue Live! (2005)
- En Vogue: 20th Anniversary Tour (2009–2011)
- For the Love of Music (2017)
- European Tour (2018)
- European Tour (2025)

Co-headlining

- The Colors of Christmas Tour (2004) (with Peabo Bryson)

Special guest

- Mixtape Tour (2022) (New Kids on the Block)
- It's Iconic Tour (2026) (Salt-N-Pepa and TLC)

Opening act

- Please Hammer Don't Hurt 'Em World Tour (1990) (MC Hammer)
- Never Let Me Go Tour (1993) (Luther Vandross)

== Filmography ==
=== Film ===
Year	Title	Role	Notes
1992	Aces: Iron Eagle III	Performers	Cameo appearance
1995	Batman Forever	Girls on the corner	Cameo appearance
2014	An En Vogue Christmas	Themselves	Main role
2021	Coming 2 America	Themselves	Cameo appearance

=== Television ===
Year	Title	Role	Episode
1990	Super Dave	Themselves	Episode: "Geiger Car"
1993	In Living Color	Themselves	Episode: "Stacy Koon's Police Academy"
1993	A Different World	Charity, Faith, Henrietta, Hope	Episode: "Mind Your Own Business"
1993	Roc	The Downtown Divas	3 episodes
1993	Sesame Street	Themselves	"Sesame Street's 25th Birthday: A Musical Celebration"
1998	Sesame Street	Themselves	Episode: "Elmopalooza"
1997	The Wayans Bros.	Themselves	Episode: "I Was En Vogue's Love Slave "
2008	Don't Forget the Lyrics!	Themselves	Episode: "En Vogue"
2022	The Masked Singer	Themselves	Season 7 contestants; 3 episodes

== See also ==
- List of best-selling girl groups
