= Give It Up, Turn It Loose =

1992 single by En Vogue

Single by En Vogue

from the album Funky Divas
- B-side: "Free Your Mind" (Theo's Rec & Wreck Remix)
- Released: November 19, 1992
- Recorded: November 1991–January 1992
- Length: 5:13
- Label: EastWest
- Songwriters: Thomas McElroy; Denzil Foster
- Producers: Denzil Foster; Thomas McElroy

En Vogue singles chronology
"Free Your Mind" (1992)	"Give It Up, Turn It Loose" (1992)	"Love Don't Love You" (1993)

Music video
- "Give It Up, Turn It Loose" on YouTube

"Give It Up, Turn It Loose" is a song by American R&B/pop vocal group En Vogue, released as the fourth single from their second album, Funky Divas (1992). The song's title is a reference to the 1969 James Brown song "Give It Up or Turnit a Loose". Released on November 12, 1992 by Eastwest Records, the single reached numbers 13 and 15 on the US Cash Box Top 100 and Billboard Hot 100, number 16 on the Billboard Hot R&B Singles chart, and number 22 on the UK Singles Chart. It was written and produced by Thomas McElroy and Denzil Foster and features Maxine Jones on lead entirely. The accompanying music video was directed by Marcus Nispel. In 1994, the song was nominated for a Grammy Award for Best R&B Performance by a Duo or Group with Vocals at the 36th Annual Grammy Awards.

== Critical reception ==
AllMusic editor Jose F. Promis described "Give It Up, Turn It Loose" as a "doo wop good-feelin'"-song. Daryl Easlea for BBC noted its "smooth old-school groove". Larry Flick from Billboard magazine wrote that here, the group vocally "glides with ease over a languid, retro-soul shuffle beat. Jazzy flutes and restrained funk guitars add texture that will warm the hearts of pop and urban folks alike." Randy Clark from Cash Box stated, "Although they use the same basic sound and style, these Funky Divas have opted for a more smooth and kicked back approach on this track, compared to their current spirited hit single, with an over-all vibe that's slightly reminiscent of Cheryl Lynn's 'Got to Be Real'." John Martinucci from the Gavin Report found that "Maxine and the girls are giving some sisterly advice for those who are stuck in dead end relationships", calling it a "down-tempo track". In his weekly UK chart commentary, James Masterton wrote, "If anything 'Give It Up' has less to recommend it than some of the others and so is unlikely to end up one of their bigger hits."

Paul Lester from Melody Maker named it "yet another funky En Vogue thing." Pan-European magazine Music & Media commented, "In which direction will the catwalk lead this time? To soul music a la the Pointer Sisters, or four Mariah Careys." Parry Gettelman from Orlando Sentinel declared the "mid-tempo workout" as "a neat kiss-off song". Mark Sutherland from Smash Hits gave it a score of four out of five, adding, "Not quite as snazzy as their last two hits, but still rather fabulous. The four Voguestresses strut about funkily and inform us that "love knocks you on your behind" in such a poignant fashion that you can only nod sagely and mutter 'how true'." Cheo H. Coker from Stanford Daily named it "perhaps the most enjoyable on the album; the jam is the catchiest thing since its DeBarge predecessor, 'I Like It', from which it takes its inspiration."

== Music video ==
The music video for "Give It Up, Turn It Loose" was directed by German feature film director and producer Marcus Nispel. It is made in black-and-white and features the group performing in a beauty parlor while clips of life in the city play throughout the video. It was later made available on YouTube in 2015, and had generated more than 1.6 million views as of March 2026.

== Track listings ==
- US cassette single
1. "Give It Up, Turn It Loose" (LP edit)
2. "You Don't Have to Worry" (club remix)
- US maxi-single
1. "Turn It Loose" (Kevin's Extended R&B Mix) – 5:17
2. "Turn It Loose" ("Welcome to the Ghetto" Hip Hop Mix) – 5:26
3. "Turn It Loose" (Kevin's Extended Jazz Mix) – 4:58
4. "Turn It Loose" (Somethin' for the People Remix) – 5:50
- UK CD single
1. "Give It Up, Turn It Loose" (LP edit) – 4:05
2. "Free Your Mind" (Theo's Rap and Wreck Mix) – 5:41
3. "Hold On" (radio version with intro) – 5:02
4. "Give It Up, Turn It Loose" (Kevin's Jazz Mix) – 4:20
- UK 7-inch vinyl

A. "Give It Up, Turn It Loose" (LP edit) – 4:05
B. "Free Your Mind" (Theo's Rec & Wreck Remix) – 5:41

== Charts ==
=== Weekly charts ===
Chart (1993)	Peak position
Australia (ARIA)	96
Canada Top Singles (RPM)	36
Europe (Eurochart Hot 100)	84
Europe (European Dance Radio)	3
Iceland (Íslenski Listinn Topp 40)	26
Ireland (IRMA)	30
Israel (Israeli Singles Chart)	28
New Zealand (Recorded Music NZ)	34
Switzerland (Schweizer Hitparade)	36
UK Singles (Official Charts)	22
UK Airplay (Music Week)	15
UK Dance (Music Week)	8
US Billboard Hot 100	15
US Dance Singles Sales (Billboard)	14
US Hot R&B/Hip-Hop Songs (Billboard)	16
US Pop Airplay (Billboard)	10
US Rhythmic Airplay (Billboard)	15
US Cash Box Top 100	13

=== Year-end charts ===
Chart (1993)	Position
US Billboard Hot 100	84
US Hot R&B Singles (Billboard)	69

== Release history ==
Region	Date	Format(s)	Label(s)	Ref.
United States	November 19, 1992	CD	EastWest	
United Kingdom	January 4, 1993	7-inch vinyl; 12-inch vinyl; CD; cassette	EastWest	
Australia	May 23, 1993	CD; cassette	EastWest	
