= Laura Checkoway =

American journalist and filmmaker

- Occupations: Director, producer, editor, screenwriter and journalist
- Website: www.lauracheckoway.com

Laura Checkoway is a documentary filmmaker, director, producer, editor, journalist, and writer. She is best known for directing the Academy Award nominated documentary short Edith+Eddie and the feature documentary The Cave of Adullam, which won Best Documentary Feature and the Audience Award at the Tribeca Film Festival. Before expanding into filmmaking, Checkoway was a journalist and magazine editor, and co-authored My Infamous Life: The Autobiography of Mobb Deep's Prodigy.

== Style and themes ==
Film critics have consistently highlighted Checkoway's cinéma vérité style and character-centered storytelling, distinguished by long-term immersion and access. Across her filmography, critics identify tenderness, compassion, honesty, and emotional vulnerability.

== Career ==
=== Journalism ===
Before branching into documentary filmmaking, Checkoway had a lauded career as a journalist and magazine editor, serving as a senior editor at Vibe alongside writing for Rolling Stone and The Village Voice, among others.

Raised on poetry and hip-hop, her cinematic storytelling leapt off the page; her attention to detail and interest in psychology created vivid insightful portraits of the era’s most beloved artists and superstars. Some of her notable stories include traveling throughout Nigeria with Jay-Z, Mary J. Blige, Chris Brown, and Rihanna; celebrating blues legend B.B. King’s birthday with him in his Mississippi Delta hometown; chronicling singer Solange's rise to stardom in the shadows of her famous sister Beyoncé; and profiles introducing rising stars to the world including a teenage Teyana Taylor.

Checkoway co-authored the memoir My Infamous Life: The Autobiography of Mobb Deep's Prodigy with Prodigy (Simon and Schuster, 2011), the culmination of a multi-year collaboration between the two. The book received critical acclaim for its raw depiction of the hip-hop industry and criminal justice system and was described in the Ringer as being "one of the best music autobiographies ever.”

Checkoway has cited her background in long-form journalism as foundational to her documentary methodology, particularly her emphasis on extended reporting, close listening, and character-driven narrative structure.

=== Film ===
==== Lucky ====
Checkoway made her directorial debut with the documentary feature Lucky (2014), executive produced by Steve James, which follows a young mother masked in tattoos who has aged out of foster care in NYC and is processing childhood trauma. Lucky had its world premiere at Hot Docs, its New York premiere at DOC NYC, and won Best Documentary at Urbanworld Film Festival.

==== Edith + Eddie ====
Checkoway directed, produced and edited the documentary short Edith+Eddie, executive produced by Steve James and Cher. The film documents America's oldest interracial newlyweds, aged 96 and 95, and a legal guardianship dispute. It was nominated for an Academy Award and Emmy in 2018 and won the IDA Documentary Awards Best Short. Edith+Eddie received wide critical acclaim for its restrained, observational portrayal of elder care and legal authority. In The New Yorker, critic Richard Brody wrote: “One of the most impressive aspects of Checkoway’s film is that, with a simple and straightforward approach, she brings the overwhelming force of abstract institutions seemingly onto the screen.” Academy Award-winning filmmaker Julia Reichert called Edith+Eddie "One of the most beautiful and quietly furious films I've ever seen."

The film played at festivals including True/False, Sheffield DocFest and Camden International Film Festival and won top prizes at a dozen film festivals including Oscar-qualifying Hamptons International Film Festival and Palm Springs International ShortFest. At the 5th World Congress on Adult Guardianship in Seoul, South Korea, leaders in the field featured the film and discussed it, with Checkoway as a speaker.

==== The Cave of Adullam ====
Checkoway directed the feature documentary The Cave of Adullam, produced by Laurence Fishburne. The film follows Jason Wilson and his Detroit martial arts academy providing emotional development and mentorship for boys. In an interview with Deadline, Fishburne said: “She has a cinematic sensitivity and a doctor’s bedside manner... Laura doesn’t impose her personality or her energy onto anything. It boils down to her humanity and her ability to see the humanity in all.” After premiering at the Tribeca Film Festival in 2022 and winning top prizes Best Documentary and the Audience Award, the film was acquired and released by ESPN Films.

The film won multiple festival awards and received a Cinema Eye Honors nomination. That year, Checkoway also received the NYWIFT Excellence in Documentary Filmmaking Award.

==== The Cat Man Eshete ====
In 2025, she directed the documentary short The Cat Man Eshete which was released worldwide by Al Jazeera English’s award-winning series Witness on World Refugee Day. The film tells the extraordinary story of Eshete, who escaped the Ethiopian Civil War on foot as a young man and is now a devoted caretaker of a feral cat colony in Brooklyn, New York. The film won Best Short Documentary and the Audience Award at the Charlotte Film Festival.

==== Brand Entertainment ====
Checkoway’s authentic style and her emotionally impactful work has been noticed by multiple major brands, winning the Brand Entertainment Webby Award in both 2024 and 2025. She has directed work for Unilever, Amazon, Tribeca Studios, and ServiceNow, and served as the series director on the original documentary series ‘We Were Here’ for YouTube and the UNHCR.

== Selected awards and honors ==
- 2017: IDA Documentary Award winner for Best Short (Edith+Eddie)
- 2018: Academy Award nomination for Best Documentary Short Subject (Edith+Eddie)
- 2018: News and Documentary Emmy Award nomination (Edith+Eddie)
- 2018: Cinema Eye Honors nomination (Edith+Eddie)
- 2020: Two New York Emmy nominations (A Dream Deferred)
- 2022: New York Women in Film & Television (NYWIFT) Excellence in Documentary Filmmaking Award
- 2024: Webby Awards People's Voice Winner Documentary Series (Series & Channels) ('We Were Here' UNHCR x Youtube)
- 2025: Webby Awards Winner B2B (Video & Film)(‘Alt Shift Life’ ServiceNow x Tribeca Studios)

== Selected Filmography ==
- 2025: The Cat Man Eshete [Credits: Director, Producer](Documentary short)
- 2025: ‘Alt Shift Life’ ServiceNow x Tribeca Studios [Credit: Director / Writer](Documentary short)
- 2024: 'We Were Here' UNHCR x Youtube [Credit: Director / Series Director](Documentary short)
- 2022: The Cave of Adullam [Credits: Director, Producer](Documentary feature) Executive producer Laurence Fishburne.
- 2017: Edith+Eddie [Credits: Director, Producer, Editor](Documentary short) Executive producers Steve James and Cher.
- 2016: Wolffland [Credits: Director, Producer, Editor](Documentary short)
- 2014: Lucky [Credits: Director, Producer, Editor](Documentary feature) Executive producer Steve James.
