= Free Your Mind (En Vogue song) =

1992 single by En Vogue

Single by En Vogue

from the album Funky Divas
- Released: September 24, 1992
- Genre: Hard rock; pop rock; funk rock
- Length: 4:52 (album version); 4:10 (LP edit)
- Label: East West
- Songwriters: Denzil Foster; Thomas McElroy
- Producer: Foster & McElroy

En Vogue singles chronology
"Giving Him Something He Can Feel" (1992)	"Free Your Mind" (1992)	"Give It Up, Turn It Loose" (1992)

Music video
- "Free Your Mind" on YouTube

"Free Your Mind" is a song by American female group En Vogue from their second album, Funky Divas (1992). The track was composed and produced by Foster and McElroy. They were inspired by the Funkadelic song "Free Your Mind and Your Ass Will Follow". The guitar and bass tracks for the song were written and recorded by San Francisco-based guitarist Jinx Jones. The opening line: "Prejudice, wrote a song about it. Like to hear it? Here it go!", is adapted from a line originally used by David Alan Grier's character Calhoun Tubbs from Fox's In Living Color.

Issued as the third single from Funky Divas on September 24, 1992, by East West Records, "Free Your Mind" became a top-10 hit on both the US Billboard Hot 100 and Cash Box Top 100, and a top-20 hit on the UK Singles Chart. The accompanying music video was directed by Mark Romanek. The song was nominated for two Grammy Awards at the 35th Annual Grammy Awards and eight MTV Video Music Awards at the 1993 MTV Video Music Awards, winning three. An alternative version of the song with different lyrics appears on the 1992 Summer Olympics compilation album Barcelona Gold. Billboard named the song No. 41 on their list of "100 Greatest Girl Group Songs of All Time" in 2017.

== Critical reception ==
Upon the release, Jennifer Bowles from Associated Press named the song a "plea for racial tolerance". Larry Flick from Billboard magazine felt it takes in "a more edgy direction" than in the past for the group. He remarked that placed "within a driving, guitar-anchored pop/rock setting, the group attacks well-crafted lyrics on racism with unrelenting passion and its trademark harmonies. Will jolt many at first, but will ultimately open many eyes." Dave Sholin from the Gavin Report commented, "Attacking prejudice head on, The Funky Divas offer advice to those who judge others by looks rather than action. Harmonies don't get any better than when these four incredible voices combine their talents." Connie Johnson from the Los Angeles Times felt the song was a "pleasant surprise", "which confronts the prejudice even a funky diva faces, be it from store clerks—'I can't look without being watched!'—or those who don't understand that while they 'might date another race or color, that doesn't mean I don't like my strong black brothers'." Pan-European magazine Music & Media noted that "the "Jackies" of all trades are breaking all the barriers in radio land", describing the song as "funk rock" and a "George Clinton cover as colourful as his dyed hair".

Gerald Martinez from the New Sunday Times called the song "storming", and said it "combines hard rock riffng with funk while En Vogue wail away with awesome power." Parry Gettelman from Orlando Sentinel wrote, "'Free Your Mind' owes a small lyrical debt to George Clinton and a large musical debt to LaBelle – not bad places from which to borrow. There's a brief, funny spoken intro that parodies an In Living Color sketch, and the quartet slams into a denunciation of prejudice of all sorts: 'I might date another race or color/ Doesn't mean I don't like my strong black brothers'." A reviewer from People viewed it as a "the Pointer Sisters-meet-Van Halen rocker". Danyel Smith from Rolling Stone described it as "guitar-ravaged" Cheo H. Coker from Stanford Daily felt En Vogue's "foray into rock 'n' roll [is] completely unsuited for the group, reminiscent of Janet Jackson's 'Black Cat'. While the song has great message, black rock is better left to the black rockers."

=== Retrospective response ===
In a 2017 retrospective review, Quentin Harrison from Albumism described "Free Your Mind" as "a searing rock number that challenged racism, sexism and other social phobias head on was all at once, smart, sexy and provocative." AllMusic's review critic, Jose F. Promis, voted the single very favorable and rated the Funky Divas album its highest rating at five. He also declared the track as a "hard rock smash". Another editor, Stephen Thomas Erlewine, described it as "swaggering". In his 2009 review, Daryl Easlea for BBC remarked that the song borrows from "heavy metal". In 2007, Laura Checkoway from Vibe called it a "rock-ish anthem with a George Clinton-lifted chorus".

== Commercial performance ==
"Free Your Mind" debuted at number 89 on the US Billboard Hot 100 the week of September 12, 1992. Within one week, it jumped to number 45, then to number 25, and continued to make impressive strides until it eventually peaked at number 8 the week of October 31, 1992. Altogether, "Free Your Mind" spent 16 weeks in the top 40 of the Billboard Hot 100. It reached the top twenty on the UK singles chart, where it was released as a double A-side single with "Giving Him Something He Can Feel". It was certified gold by the Recording Industry Association of America in late 1992.

== Music video and other notable performances ==
The song is known for its innovative, award-winning music video, directed by American director Mark Romanek with production design by Nigel Phelps and art direction by Brad Hartmaier. On March 21, 1992, En Vogue performed "Free Your Mind" on Saturday Night Live. On January 21, 1993, En Vogue performed the song on a sixth-season episode of the NBC sitcom A Different World, where they guest-starred as Vernon Gaines' (Lou Myers) nieces. It is one of several songs to feature all four members of the group, Dawn Robinson, Terry Ellis, Cindy Herron and Maxine Jones, on lead vocals. Janet Jackson included the video in her BET countdown of her 25 favorite videos of all-time at number 11.

== Awards and nominations ==
=== Grammy Awards, 1993 ===
- Best Rock Vocal Performance by a Duo or Group (nominated)
- Best Music Video, Short Form (nominated)

=== MTV Video Music Awards, 1993 ===
- Video of the Year (nominated)
- Best Group Video (nominated)
- Best R&B Video (won)
- Best Dance Video (won)
- Viewer's Choice Award (nominated)
- Best Direction – Mark Romanek (nominated)
- Best Choreography – Travis Payne, Frank Gatson Jr., and Lavelle Smith Jr. (won)
- Best Cinematography – Marc Reshovsky (nominated)

== Track listings ==
- US CD single
1. "Free Your Mind" (LP edit) – 4:10
2. "Just Can't Stay Away" – 5:11
- UK CD maxi single
1. "Free Your Mind" (LP edit) – 4:10
2. "Giving Him Something He Can Feel" (LP version) – 3:55
3. "Free Your Mind" (Tommy's Spoiled Brat edit) – 3:58
4. "Time Goes On" (Dance remix) – 5:45
- US CD maxi single
1. "Free Your Mind" (Theo's Rec and Wreck mix) – 5:41
2. "Free Your Mind" (Tommy's Spoiled Brat mix) – 5:00
3. "Free Your Mind" (James' club mix) – 4:55
4. "Free Your Mind" (Marley Marl remix) – 5:27
5. "Lies" (Eddie F remix) – 5:43

== Charts ==
=== Weekly charts ===
Chart (1992–1993)	Peak position
Australia (ARIA)	39
Belgium (Ultratop 50 Flanders)	37
Canada Top Singles (RPM)	19
Europe (Eurochart Hot 100)	38
Europe (European Dance Radio)	9
Finland (Suomen virallinen lista)	13
Ireland (IRMA) with "Giving Him Something He Can Feel"	23
Netherlands (Dutch Top 40)	7
Netherlands (Single Top 100)	15
New Zealand (Recorded Music NZ)	12
Sweden (Sverigetopplistan)	29
UK Singles (Official Charts) with "Giving Him Something He Can Feel"	16
UK Airplay (Music Week)	8
UK Dance (Music Week) with "Giving Him Something He Can Feel"	23
US Billboard Hot 100	8
US Dance Club Songs (Billboard)	39
US Dance Singles Sales (Billboard)	9
US Hot R&B/Hip-Hop Songs (Billboard)	23
US Pop Airplay (Billboard)	13
US Rhythmic Airplay (Billboard)	11
US Cash Box Top 100	5

Chart (2002)	Peak position
Germany (GfK) Sub7even featuring En Vogue	71

=== Year-end charts ===
Chart (1992)	Position
Netherlands (Dutch Top 40)	89
US Billboard Hot 100	93

== Certifications ==
Region	Certification	Certified units/sales
United States (RIAA)	Gold	500,000^{^}
^{^} Shipments figures based on certification alone.

== Release history ==
Region	Date	Format(s)	Label(s)	Ref.
United States	September 24, 1992	7-inch vinyl; 12-inch vinyl; CD; cassette	EastWest	
United Kingdom	October 26, 1992	7-inch vinyl; 12-inch vinyl; CD; cassette	EastWest	
Australia	November 2, 1992	CD; cassette	EastWest	
Japan	November 28, 1992	Mini-CD	EastWest	

== Cover versions and other usage ==
- Faith No More covered snippets of the song on tour for their 1992 album Angel Dust.
- The Band covered the song on their 1996 album High on the Hog.
- In 1997, rap rock group Twiztid sampled it in their song "2nd Hand Smoke".
- The song was used in the season 6 of the sitcom A Different World in an episode titled "Mind Your Own Business".
- German rock band Sub7even covered the song with En Vogue (Cindy Herron, Terry Ellis, Amanda Cole) in 2002 on their album, Free Your Mind.
- Japanese R&B duo Double recorded a cover of the song in 1995 and included it on their first remix album Crystal Planet.
- The song was covered as part of a mash-up on Fox's Glee along with "Stop! In the Name of Love" by the Supremes in the episode "Never Been Kissed".
- Swedish band Slapdash covered the song, which is featured as track 13 on their album Actual Reality.
- The song was used on the show Modern Family in an episode titled "Manny Get Your Gun" during a flash mob scene.
- Greek pop star Elena Paparizou performed a cover of the song at the first MadWalk by Vodafone on February 2, 2011, along with her smash hit single "Baby It's Over", in an outfit by Apostolos Mitropoulos.
- The track has been included in one of Les Mills' BodyVive class. The song was used in the trailer for the Seth Rogen comedy The Interview.
- The song was used in the 1994 film The Cowboy Way.
- The song was used in the Malcolm in the Middle episode "Hal Quits" in the scene where Hal (Bryan Cranston) is throwing paint at a large canvas in the garage.
- A theme tune was used for an early series of Rory Bremner, Who Else in 1993 that bears a strikingly similar beat and guitar hook.
- En Vogue recorded a second alternative version in 2017 for the Netflix shows Orange Is the New Black and GLOW.
- The song was used in episode 10 of the sixth season of RuPaul's Drag Race All Stars during a lip-sync battle between Serena ChaCha and Jiggly Caliente.
- The song was again used on episode 3 of the second season of Drag Race Holland during a lip-sync battle between The Countess and Ivy-Elyse Munroe.
- Acapella girl group Citizen Queen covered it in 2020.
- British girl-group Little Mix sang the chorus of "Free Your Mind" as the bridge during a rock rendition of their song "Woman Like Me" during their 2022 Confetti Tour.

== See also ==
- 1992 in music
