= My Lovin' (You're Never Gonna Get It) =

1992 single by En Vogue

Single by En Vogue

from the album Funky Divas
- B-side: "Part of Me"
- Released: March 11, 1992
- Genre: Pop; funk; R&B
- Length: 4:42 (album version); 4:12 (radio edit)
- Label: EastWest
- Songwriters: Denzil Foster; Thomas McElroy; James Brown; Fred Wesley; John Starks
- Producers: Denzil Foster; Thomas McElroy

En Vogue singles chronology
"Strange" (1991)	"My Lovin' (You're Never Gonna Get It)" (1992)	"Giving Him Something He Can Feel" (1992)

Music video
- "My Lovin' (You're Never Gonna Get It)" on YouTube

"My Lovin' (You're Never Gonna Get It)" is a song by American pop/R&B group En Vogue, released in March 1992 by Eastwest Records as the lead single from their multi-platinum second album, Funky Divas (1992). The song was co-written and produced by Denzil Foster and Thomas McElroy, and it samples the guitar riff from the James Brown song "The Payback".

"My Lovin" reached number two on the US Billboard Hot 100, becoming En Vogue's joint highest-peaking single on the chart, alongside "Hold On" and "Don't Let Go (Love)", and it peaked atop the Billboard Hot R&B Singles chart for two weeks. Internationally, the song reached number four in the United Kingdom and peaked within the top 10 on the charts of Canada, Ireland, Israel and the Netherlands. The single was certified gold by the Recording Industry Association of America (RIAA).

NME ranked the song at number eight on their list of the "Singles of the Year" in December 1992. VH1 ranked it number 43 on its list for the "100 Greatest Songs of the '90s". In October 2023, Billboard ranked it among the "500 Best Pop Songs of All Time". The song's accompanying music video was directed by Matthew Rolston, and was inspired by the "Big Spender" number from the musical Sweet Charity. It was nominated in six categories at the MTV Video Music Awards, winning one.

== Production ==
"My Lovin'" contains a sample of the guitar riff from the James Brown song "The Payback" from the album of the same name, which is looped throughout the entire song and forms the basis of the melody. The song features Maxine Jones and Dawn Robinson on lead vocals. In a 1992 article, En Vogue mentioned this was one of the last songs they recorded for Funky Divas, which resulted in its release as a single so close to the album's release date.

== Critical reception ==
Upon the release, Larry Flick from Billboard magazine named it a "slinky pop/funk trinket that wraps its signature harmonies with Chic-style guitars, jazzy flute fills, and a muscular bass line." A reviewer from Cash Box stated that En Vogue "has returned in full thrust", and noted further that "it's needless to say that the vocal arrangements are outstanding, because you should already know that. The musical production is also above average and featured is a catchy James Brown sample." Glenn Kenny from Entertainment Weekly remarked that it "has a cool, mantra-like hook." Dave Sholin from the Gavin Report stated that "this San Francisco Bay Area foursome clearly demonstrates that their dazzling 1990 debut was only a glimmer of their potential. Writers/producers Thomas McElroy and Denzil Foster provide the material and these Funky Divas do the rest. What harmony! What grace! They just don't make them any sweeter." Connie Johnson from Los Angeles Times felt "My Lovin'" "owes a debt to the rugged, rhythmic edge of Brown's 'The Payback' to underline its sassy message."

Davydd Chong from Music Week's RM Dance Update declared it as "a sassy combination of lubricated basslines, airy flutes and their trademark, close harmonies, and it's just as funky as 'Hold On'." Gerald Martinez from New Sunday Times called it "a funky workout featuring swooping harmonies with a dazzling a capella jazz-swing breakdown midway". Parry Gettelman from Orlando Sentinel complimented its "glorious, spun-sugar a cappella harmonies". He felt "My Lovin'" "is as assertive and self-assured as it is fast and funky", and noted that the dynamics "are nice and sneaky". A reviewer from People Magazine said the track "should shimmy up the charts nicely." Danyel Smith from Rolling Stone viewed songs like "My Lovin'" as "filler made listenable only by the girls' "sweet, strong singing - the songs should never have made the cut." Adam Higginbotham from Select constated that here, Funky Divas "lives up to its title". Cheo H. Coker from Stanford Daily stated that "it's typical (meaning funkee) En Vogue; soulful, impassioned singing matched with a hip-hop groove that won't upset the sensibilities of the hardcore hip-hop fan."

== Chart performance ==
"My Lovin'" was the group's fourth number-one on the Hot R&B Singles charts, occupying the position for two weeks. It debuted on the US Billboard Hot 100 singles chart at number 71 on the week of March 21, 1992, and jumped to number 47 the following week. The single peaked at number two on the week of May 16, 1992, where it remained for three consecutive weeks. It remained in the top 10 for 13 weeks and in the top 40 for 22 weeks.

"My Lovin'" reached number four on the UK Singles Chart due to a performance of the single by En Vogue on the UK music show Top Of The Pops, becoming the group's highest-charting single there. In addition, it reached number nine in Ireland, number 10 in Canada and the Netherlands, and number 11 in New Zealand.

== Retrospective review ==
In a 2017 retrospective review, Quentin Harrison from Albumism noted the "soul sass" of the song. AllMusic editor Jose F. Promis felt it "combined perfect harmonies, street sass, and 1990s female assertion to create one of the biggest hits of 1992, as well as a catch phrase which became ubiquitous in popular culture." Another AllMusic editor, Stephen Thomas Erlewine, described it as "swaggering". Daryl Easlea for BBC in 2009 noted its "pop sensibility". Christine Werthman from Complex said the song "isn’t some polite rejection; it’s a hope-the-door-hits-your-ass-on-your-way-out tell-off. Maybe next time, you'll give your woman a little respect, Robinson taunts. That just as well may have been an 'R-E-S-P-E-C-T' as the four divas say everything the Chiffons never could." In a 2020 retrospective review, Pop Rescue named it "a masterpiece!" Laura Checkoway from Vibe wrote that on the song, En Vogue was "sassy" and "assertive".

== Music video ==
The music video for "My Lovin' (You're Never Gonna Get It)" was directed by American director Matthew Rolston in February 1992. The video features the group singing the song, intercut with footage of two male backup dancers, clad in zentai, dancing. The video was inspired by the "Big Spender" number from the musical Sweet Charity. It was nominated in six categories at the 1992 MTV Video Music Awards including Best Group Video, Best Dance Video, Best Direction in a Video, Best Editing in a Video and Best Cinematography in a Video, and won in the category for Best Choreography with choreographers Frank Gatson Jr., Travis Payne and LaVelle Smith Jr. receiving the award.

== Impact and legacy ==
NME ranked "My Lovin'" No. 8 in their list of "Singles of the Year" in December 1992.

The Village Voice ranked the song No. 37 in their list of "Top Singles of the 90's" in 1999.

Blender ranked it No. 148 on their list of "500 Greatest Songs Since You Were Born" in 2005. They wrote: "Before En Vogue, girl-group harmonies hadn't been heard in such force on the pop charts for three decades. With Maxine Jones and Dawn Robinson singing lead, this was a female-empowerment anthem that would have done Lilith Fair proud-the repeated harmonized chanting of "You're never gonna get it" was a kiss-off par excellence. The song-and the group-were anachronisms. It was unprocessed feistiness and sass, just before hip-hop took out a monopoly on swagger."

Pitchfork Media ranked it the 166th best track of the 1990s, commenting that "With simmering (not shimmering) James Brown guitars, fidgety new-jack beats, and tightly harmonized "ooh BOP"s, funky divas Cindy Herron, Maxine Jones, Terry Ellis, and Dawn Robinson gave the Sister Act era its "Respect"."

Slant Magazine ranked the song No. 39 in its "The 100 Best Singles of the 1990s"-list in 2011. Billboard named the song No. 6 on their list of "100 Greatest Girl Group Songs of All Time" and No. 471 in their "Best Pop Songs of All Time" list in October 2023. The magazine praised its "magic moment"; "The a cappella breakdown that hits about 3:30 in is a showstopping demonstration of the foursome’s butter-smooth vocal harmonies."

=== Accolades ===
Year	Publisher	Country	Accolade	Rank
1992	NME	United Kingdom	"Singles of the Year"	8
1992	The Village Voice	United States	"Singles of the Year"	4
1999	The Village Voice	United States	"Top Singles of the 90's"	37
2004	Q	United Kingdom	"The 1010 Songs You Must Own"	*
2005	Blender	United States	"500 Greatest Songs Since You Were Born"	148
2005	Bruce Pollock	United States	"The 7,500 Most Important Songs of 1944-2000"	*
2007	VH1	United States	"100 Greatest Songs of the 90s"	43
2010	Pitchfork	United States	"The Top 200 Tracks of the 1990s"	166
2011	Slant Magazine	United States	"The 100 Best Singles of the 1990s"	39
2011	Robert Dimery	United States	"10,001 Songs You Must Hear"	*
2012	Complex	United States	"The Best 90s R&B Songs"	19
2017	Billboard	United States	"100 Greatest Girl Group Songs of All Time"	6
2019	Billboard	United States	"Billboard's Top Songs of the '90s"	209
2022	Pitchfork	United States	"The 250 Best Songs of the 1990s"	172
2023	Billboard	United States	"Best Pop Songs of All Time"	471

== Awards and nominations ==
Year	Award	Category	Result
1992	MTV Video Music Award	Best Choreography	Won
1992	MTV Video Music Award	Best Group Video	Nominated
1992	MTV Video Music Award	Best Dance Video	Nominated
1992	MTV Video Music Award	Best Direction	Nominated
1992	MTV Video Music Award	Best Editing	Nominated
1992	MTV Video Music Award	Best Cinematography	Nominated

== Track listing ==
- US 12-inch single
1. "My Lovin'" (Theo's Cheaptrick remix) – 6:46
2. "My Lovin'" (Radio Active) – 4:50
3. "My Lovin'" (The Morning After dub) – 5:37
4. "My Lovin'" (Hyperradio) – 5:13
- UK CD single
1. "My Lovin'" (radio edit) – 4:16
2. "My Lovin'" (extended) – 5:03
3. "My Lovin'" (LP version) – 4:44
4. "My Lovin'" (extended edit) – 4:11
- US CD single
1. "My Lovin'" (Radio Active #2) – 4:41
2. "My Lovin'" (Hyper radio mix) – 5:12
3. "My Lovin'" (Theo's Cheaptrick remix) – 4:41

== Personnel ==
- Production – Denzil Foster, Thomas McElroy
- Remixing – Theo Mizuhara
- Executive production – Denzil Foster, Thomas McElroy

== Charts ==
=== Weekly charts ===
Chart (1992)	Peak position
Australia (ARIA)	36
Austria (Ö3 Austria Top 40)	13
Belgium (Ultratop 50 Flanders)	17
Canada Top Singles (RPM)	10
Canada Dance/Urban (RPM)	3
Europe (Eurochart Hot 100)	7
Europe (European Dance Radio)	7
France (SNEP)	34
Germany (GfK)	23
Greece (IFPI)	6
Ireland (IRMA)	9
Israel (Israeli Singles Chart)	8
Netherlands (Dutch Top 40)	11
Netherlands (Single Top 100)	10
New Zealand (Recorded Music NZ)	11
Sweden (Sverigetopplistan)	19
Switzerland (Schweizer Hitparade)	16
UK Singles (Official Charts)	4
UK Airplay (Music Week)	4
UK Dance (Music Week)	7
UK Club Chart (Music Week)	10
US Billboard Hot 100	2
US Dance Club Songs (Billboard)	8
US Dance Singles Sales (Billboard)	1
US Hot R&B/Hip-Hop Songs (Billboard)	1
US Cash Box Top 100	1

=== Year-end charts ===
Chart (1992)	Position
Brazil (Crowley)	57
Canada Top Singles (RPM)	95
Canada Dance/Urban (RPM)	32
Europe (Eurochart Hot 100)	90
Netherlands (Dutch Top 40)	68
Netherlands (Single Top 100)	80
UK Singles (OCC)	51
UK Airplay (Music Week)	34
US Billboard Hot 100	7
US Hot R&B Singles (Billboard)	31
US Maxi-Singles Sales (Billboard)	7
US Cash Box Top 100	8

== Certifications ==
Region	Certification	Certified units/sales
United Kingdom (BPI)	Silver	200,000^{‡}
United States (RIAA)	Gold	500,000^{^}
^{^} Shipments figures based on certification alone.^{‡} Sales+streaming figures based on certification alone.

== Release history ==
Region	Date	Format(s)	Label(s)	Ref.
United States	March 11, 1992	7-inch vinyl; 12-inch vinyl; cassette	EastWest America	
United States	March 16, 1992	Radio airplay	EastWest America	
United Kingdom	March 16, 1992	7-inch vinyl; 12-inch vinyl; CD; cassette	EastWest America	
Japan	April 25, 1992	Mini-CD	EastWest America	
Australia	May 27, 1992	12-inch vinyl; CD; cassette	EastWest America	

== See also ==
- List of number-one R&B singles of 1992 (U.S.)
