= Something He Can Feel =

1976 single by Aretha Franklin

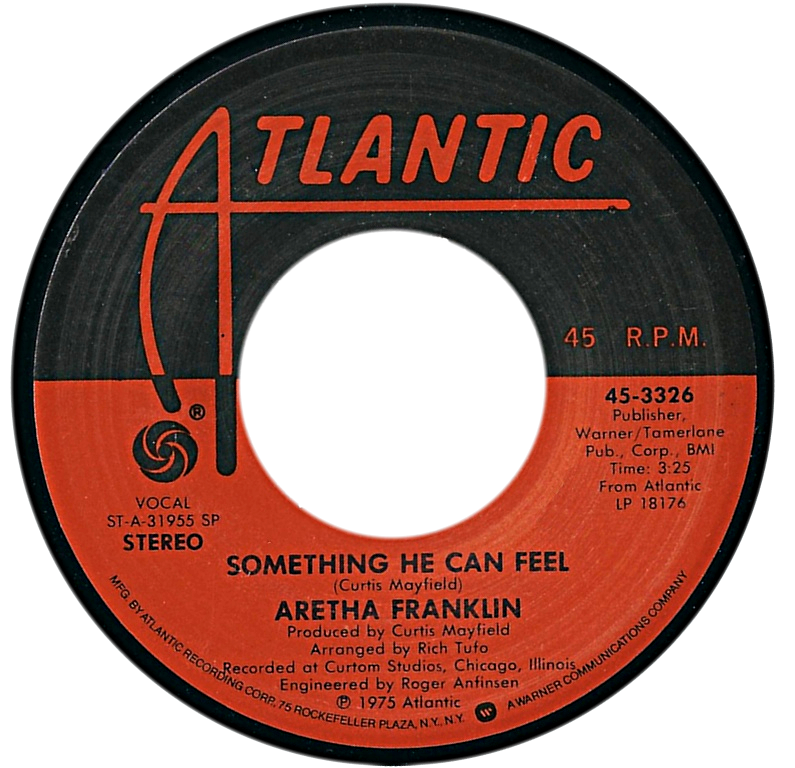
- One of A-side labels of the U.S. vinyl single

Single by Aretha Franklin

from the album Music from the Warner Bros. Picture "Sparkle"
- B-side: "Loving You Baby"
- Released: May 5, 1976
- Recorded: April 1976
- Studio: Curtom (Chicago, Illinois)
- Genre: Soul
- Length: 6:21 (album version); 3:25 (single version)
- Label: Atlantic
- Songwriter: Curtis Mayfield
- Producer: Curtis Mayfield

Aretha Franklin singles chronology
"You" (1976)	"Something He Can Feel" (1976)	"Jump" / "Hooked On Your Love" (1976)

"Something He Can Feel" is a song composed by American singer-songwriter, guitarist, and record producer Curtis Mayfield for the 1976 motion picture Sparkle. The song, a love ballad in a Chicago-/Philly-soul style, became a number-one hit on the US Billboard's R&B singles chart in the United States twice with two separate recordings: a 1976 version by Aretha Franklin from the film's soundtrack (see 1976 in music), and a 1992 cover by girl group En Vogue (see 1992 in music).

== Aretha Franklin original ==
In the original 1976 version of the film Sparkle, the song is performed by "Sister & the Sisters", with Lonette McKee on lead vocal, and Irene Cara and Dwan Smith on backing vocals. The version of "Something He Can Feel" present on the film's soundtrack album replaces the vocal tracks with those of Aretha Franklin and the Kitty Haywood Singers, with the instrumental tracks remaining the same.

Sparkle revolves around the lives of the members of Sister & the Sisters, a 1960s Motown-esque girl group, and "Something He Can Feel" is present in the film as part of their repertoire. Franklin's recording of the song was issued as the first single from the album. It was her seventeenth #1 hit on Billboard's Hot Soul Singles chart, peaking at #28 Pop in Billboard and #30 Pop in Cash Box. It was Franklin's only pop Top 40 hit during the second half of the 1970s.

Sparkle would be remade in 2012, as would "Something He Can Feel", this time performed by Carmen Ejogo on lead vocal with Jordin Sparks and Tika Sumpter on backing vocals. In an allusion to Aretha Franklin's version of the song and soundtrack, Sister & Her Sisters perform "Something He Can Feel" as part of a live TV performance headlined by Franklin.

Personnel

- Aretha Franklin - vocals, piano

=== Usage in media ===
Franklin's version of the song was featured in the second season of RuPaul's Drag Race, being performed by contestants Jujubee and Tatianna in a "lipsync for your life".

== Charts ==
Chart (1976)	Peak position
US Billboard Hot 100	28
US Hot R&B/Hip-Hop Songs (Billboard)	1

== Afrika Bambaataa feat. Boy George version ==
In 1988, hip hop artist, Afrika Bambaataa recorded a cover version of "Something He Can Feel". The cover was released on the album, The Light, a collaboration album with lead vocals on this song by Boy George.

== En Vogue version ==
"Giving Him Something He Can Feel"

Single by En Vogue

from the album Funky Divas
- Released: June 11, 1992
- Recorded: Late 1991–January 1992
- Genre: R&B; soul; gospel
- Length: 3:57
- Label: EastWest
- Songwriter: Curtis Mayfield
- Producers: Thomas McElroy; Denzil Foster

En Vogue singles chronology
"My Lovin' (You're Never Gonna Get It)" (1992)	"Giving Him Something He Can Feel" (1992)	"Free Your Mind" (1992)

Music video
- "Giving Him Something He Can Feel" on YouTube

Fifteen years after Sparkle was released, American R&B group En Vogue recorded a cover version of "Something He Can Feel"—retitled "Giving Him Something He Can Feel"—produced by Thomas McElroy and Denzil Foster. The lead vocals are sung by Dawn Robinson and the background vocals are done by Terry Ellis, Cindy Herron and Maxine Jones. The En Vogue cover was released as the second single from the group's second album, Funky Divas (1992), in June 1992 by EastWest Records, and was also a successful hit.

The single peaked at number six on both the US Billboard Hot 100 and Cash Box Top 100, and became the fifth En Vogue single in two years to peak at number one on the Billboard Hot R&B Singles chart. In the United Kingdom, it was released as a double A-side single with "Free Your Mind" and reached number 16 on the UK Singles Chart, while in New Zealand, it became En Vogue's highest-charting single, peaking at number two for two weeks. The music video was directed by Stefan Würnitzer. Nichole Cordova performed the En Vogue's version of "Something He Can Feel" on the season finale of Pussycat Dolls Present: Girlicious where she became the first member of Girlicious. She received high praise from the judges Robin Antin, Lil' Kim and Ron Fair.

=== Critical reception ===
Larry Flick of Billboard magazine complimented the song as a "lovely, retro-minded pop/R&B ballad", noting that their "remarkable trademark harmonies are always at the forefront of a musical environment that often recalls the early days of Aretha Franklin and Mary Wells." He added that the song is a "soothing interlude for all formats." Glenn Kenny from Entertainment Weekly described it as "sultry", naming it the best En Vogue song. Dave Sholin from the Gavin Report stated that here, the group "do it up stunningly, uncovering this Curtis Mayfield creation and turning it into something beyond compare." Everett True from Melody Maker said, "Effortless precision. En Vogue are the most perfectly manufactured group since Pan's People." Gerald Martinez from New Sunday Times felt the track "sees them singing low and cool, with that classic finger-snapping Motown R&B feel." Parry Gettelman from Orlando Sentinel viewed it as "exemplary", remarking that the "four superb voices" of En Vogue "unleash full gospel fervor" on the song. Cheo H. Coker from Stanford Daily declared it as "fabulous", adding, "No corn, just the sounds of sultry singing matched with sparse, yet solid, instrumentation."

=== Retrospective response ===
In a 2017 retrospective review, Quentin Harrison from Albumism remarked that En Vogue's version restored the song to its girl group roots and brought it forward into a new decade, "reverently, but boldly." AllMusic editor Jose F. Promis declared it as a "sophisticated" and "shimmering ghetto love fable", initially popularized by Aretha Franklin. Another AllMusic editor, Rob Theakston, labeled the song as a "sultry rendition". Daryl Easlea for BBC in 2009, described it as a "delicious cover". In a 2020 retrospective review, Pop Rescue stated that "whilst it’d always be hard to out-do Aretha, En Vogue are definitely worthy of a credible challenge." In 2007, Laura Checkoway from Vibe described the song as "alluring".

=== Music video ===
A music video was produced to promote the single, directed by Stefan Würnitzer. It begins with En Vogue putting on make-up. Then they perform for an audience of men in a club, standing on a stage in front of a blue curtain while wearing long red dresses. In the end, the men are giving a standing ovation for En Vogue.

=== Charts ===
==== Weekly charts ====
Chart (1992)	Peak position
Australia (ARIA)	84
Canada Top Singles (RPM)	19
Canada Adult Contemporary (RPM)	26
Europe (European Dance Radio)	23
Germany (GfK)	45
Ireland (IRMA) with "Free Your Mind"	23
Netherlands (Dutch Top 40 Tipparade)	4
Netherlands (Single Top 100)	45
New Zealand (Recorded Music NZ)	2
UK Singles (Official Charts) with "Free Your Mind"	16
UK Airplay (Music Week)	44
UK Dance (Music Week)	24
US Billboard Hot 100	6
US Adult Contemporary (Billboard)	32
US Hot R&B/Hip-Hop Songs (Billboard)	1
US Pop Airplay (Billboard)	31
US Rhythmic Airplay (Billboard)	15
US Cash Box Top 100	6

==== Year-end charts ====
Chart (1992)	Position
New Zealand (RIANZ)	39
US Billboard Hot 100	29
US Hot R&B Singles (Billboard)	33
US Cash Box Top 100	25

=== Certifications ===
Region	Certification	Certified units/sales
United States (RIAA)	Gold	500,000^{^}
^{^} Shipments figures based on certification alone.

=== Release history ===
Region	Date	Format(s)	Label(s)	Ref.
United States	June 11, 1992	CD	EastWest	
Japan	July 25, 1992	Mini-CD	EastWest	
Australia	September 14, 1992	CD; cassette	EastWest	
United Kingdom	October 26, 1992	7-inch vinyl; 12-inch vinyl; CD; cassette	EastWest	

== See also ==
- List of number-one R&B singles of 1976 (U.S.)
- List of number-one R&B singles of 1992 (U.S.)
