= En Vogue discography =

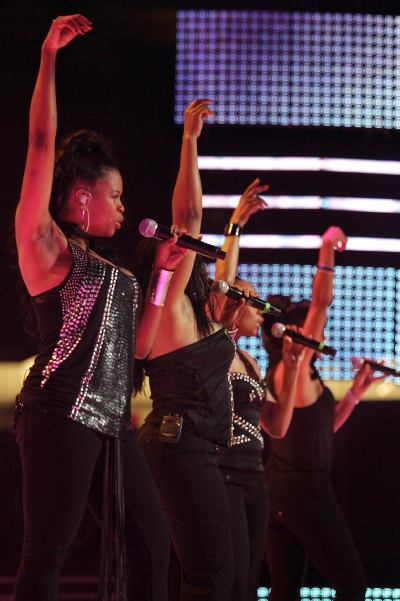
- (left to right) Dawn Robinson, Maxine Jones, Terry Ellis, and Cindy Herron in 2009.
- Studio albums: 7
- Extended plays: 2
- Live albums: 1
- Compilation albums: 3
- Singles: 28
- Music videos: 21

This is the discography of American pop/R&B quartet En Vogue who began their career in early 1990s. Their discography includes seven studio albums, two EPs, 28 singles—four as featured artists, and 21 music videos on their former record labels Atlantic, East West, Elektra, Discretion, and 33rd Street.

En Vogue released their debut album, Born to Sing, in April 1990. It peaked at number twenty-one on the Billboard 200 and number 30 on the Canadian RPM Singles Chart, while reaching the third spot on Billboard's R&B Albums chart. It was certified gold by the Recording Industry Association of America (RIAA) in June 1990 and 3× platinum by October that same year, and went gold in Canada. Within its first two years of release, it sold 3 million copies in the United States. The album produced four major single releases, including "Lies", "You Don't Have to Worry", and their debut song, "Hold On", all of which peaked at number one on the Billboard Hot R&B Singles chart. The band's second album, Funky Divas, was released in March 1992. It debuted at number one on the US Top R&B Albums chart, and at number eight on the Billboard 200, while peaking at number four on the UK Albums Chart. It reached triple platinum status in the US, where it sold 5 million copies, becoming the seventh highest-selling R&B albums of the year as well as En Vogue's biggest-selling album to date. Funky Divas spawned five singles, including "My Lovin' (You're Never Gonna Get It)", Aretha Franklin cover "Giving Him Something He Can Feel", "Free Your Mind", "Give It Up, Turn It Loose," and "Love Don't Love You".

The group's third album, EV3, their first project as a trio following the departure of Dawn Robinson, was released in June 1997. It debuted at number eight on both the US Top R&B/Hip-Hop Albums and the Billboard 200 charts, marking the band's highest debut on both charts as well as their biggest first week sales yet. EV3 was awarded platinum by the Recording Industry Association of America (RIAA), indicating sales in excess of one million copies. Elsewhere, it entered the top forty on most charts it appeared on, reaching the top ten in Germany, Switzerland, and the United Kingdom. EV3 produced three hit singles, including platinum-selling hit single "Don't Let Go (Love)", as well as "Whatever" and "Too Gone, Too Long". Masterpiece Theatre, En Vogue's fourth album, was released in May 2000. A commercial disappointment, it debuted and peaked at number 33 on the US Top R&B/Hip-Hop Albums chart and at number 67 on the Billboard 200, a considerable drop from their previous efforts. Internationally, the album failed to enter the top forty on the majority of the few charts it appeared on, through it reached number 22 and number 28 of the German and Swiss Albums Charts, where it ranks among the band's highest peaks in both countries. While first and only single "Riddle" became a top thirty hit in several European countries, Elektra Records refused to release further singles after the weak overall performance of the project, resulting in their departure from the label.

In October 2002, En Vogue's first holiday album The Gift of Christmas was released. Recorded along with Amanda Cole, it was produced and distributed through Discretion Records and featured four original songs and eight cover versions of Christmas standards and carols. They also recorded a live album with Cole, which was released in 2004. In 2003, Cole left and new member Rhona Bennett was brought in during the recording process of sixth album Soul Flower, their debut with independent label 33rd Street Records. Upon its release, the album debuted at number 47 on the US Top R&B/Hip-Hop Albums and number 15 on the Independent Albums charts. In support of it, two singles, including "Losin' My Mind" and "Ooh Boy", were released.

In 2014, En Vogue signed to Pyramid Records and released the songs "Emotions", "A Thousand Times", and "O Holy Night", which were featured in the Lifetime movie An En Vogue Christmas. The band's seventh full-length studio album, Electric Café, was released on April 6, 2018, through eOne Music and En Vogue Records.

== Albums ==
=== Studio albums ===
Title	Album details	Peak chart positions											Sales	Certifications (sales thresholds)
Title	Album details	US	US R&B /HH	AUS	BEL (FL)	CAN	FRA	GER	NLD	NZ	SWI	UK	Sales	Certifications (sales thresholds)
Born to Sing	Released: April 3, 1990; Label: Atlantic; Formats: CD, cassette	21	3	146	—	30	—	—	58	37	—	23	US: 1,700,000 (Note: United States sales of Born to Sing, as of 1992.)	RIAA: Platinum; BPI: Silver; MC: Gold
Funky Divas	Released: March 24, 1992; Label: East West; Formats: CD, cassette	8	1	66	—	34	—	58	37	36	—	4	World: 5,000,000 (Note: Worldwide sales of Funky Divas, as of 1997.); US: 4,416,000 (Note: As of October 1997, Funky Divas had sold 3,500,000 copies in the United States according to Nielsen SoundScan, which does not count albums sold through clubs like the BMG Music Club, where it sold 916,000 copies. Combined, it has sold over 4,416,000 copies in the United States.)	RIAA: 3× Platinum; BPI: Gold; MC: Platinum
EV3	Released: June 17, 1997; Label: East West; Formats: CD, cassette	8	8	20	13	28	47	9	14	29	7	9		RIAA: Platinum; BPI: Silver
Masterpiece Theatre	Released: May 23, 2000; Label: Elektra; Formats: CD, cassette	67	33	—	—	—	56	22	56	—	28	139		
The Gift of Christmas	Released: October 8, 2002; Label: Discretion; Formats: CD, download	—	—	—	—	—	—	—	—	—	—	—		
Soul Flower	Released: February 24, 2004; Label: 33rd Street; Formats: CD, download	— (Note: Soul Flower did not enter the US Billboard 200, but peaked at number 15 on the US Independent Albums chart and number 47 on the US Top R&B/Hip-Hop Albums chart.)	47	—	—	—	—	—	—	—	—	—		
Electric Café	Released: April 6, 2018; Label: En Vogue, eOne Music; Formats: CD, download	— (Note: Electric Café did not enter the US Billboard 200, but peaked at number 14 on the US Independent Albums chart and number 69 on the US Top Album Sales chart.)	—	—	—	—	—	—	—	—	—	— (Note: Electric Café did not enter the UK Albums Chart, but peaked at number 47 on the UK Independent Albums chart)		
"—" denotes a recording that did not chart or was not released in that territory.

=== Compilation albums ===
Title	Album details	Peak chart positions					Certifications (sales thresholds)
Title	Album details	AUS	AUT	GER	NLD	UK	Certifications (sales thresholds)
Best of En Vogue	Released: June 1, 1999; Label: East West; Formats: CD, download	183	37	61	43	39	BPI: Silver
The Very Best of En Vogue	Released: August 21, 2001; Label: Elektra, Rhino; Formats: CD, download	—	—	—	—	— (Note: The Very Best of En Vogue did not enter the UK Albums Chart, but peaked at number 29 on the UK Hip Hop and R&B Albums Chart.)	BPI: Silver; RMNZ: Gold
The Platinum Collection	Released: October 22, 2007; Label: Rhino, WEA; Formats: CD, download	—	—	—	—	— (Note: The Platinum Collection did not enter the UK Albums Chart, but peaked at number 39 on the UK Hip Hop and R&B Albums Chart.)	
"—" denotes a recording that did not chart or was not released in that territory.

=== Live albums ===
Title	Album details
Live in Alabama 2002	Released: November 29, 2004; Label: Charly; Formats: Download

== Extended plays ==
Title	EP details	Peak chart positions	
Title	EP details	US	US R&B /HH
Remix to Sing	Released: November 26, 1991; Label: East West	—	—
Runaway Love	Released: September 21, 1993; Label: East West	49	16
Rufftown Presents En Vogue	Released: April 14, 2015; Label: Rufftown	—	—
"—" denotes a recording that did not chart or was not released in that territory.

== Singles ==
=== As main performer ===
==== 1990s ====
Title	Year	Peak chart positions											Certifications (sales threshold)	Album
Title	Year	US	US R&B /HH	AUS	BEL (FL)	CAN	GER	IRE	NLD	NZ	SWI	UK	Certifications (sales threshold)	Album
"Hold On"	1990	2	1	64	—	51	—	18	10	5	—	5	RIAA: Platinum	Born to Sing
"Lies"	1990	38	1	156	—	72	—	—	42	—	—	44		Born to Sing
"You Don't Have to Worry"	1990	— (Note: "You Don't Have to Worry" did not enter the US Billboard Hot 100, but peaked at number 57 on the US Radio Songs chart and number 1 on the US Hot R&B/Hip-Hop Songs chart.)	1	—	—	—	—	—	—	—	—	94		Born to Sing
"Don't Go"	1991	— (Note: "Don't Go" did not enter the US Billboard Hot 100, but peaked at number 3 on the US Hot R&B/Hip-Hop Songs chart.)	3	—	—	—	—	—	—	—	—	117		Born to Sing
"Strange"	1991	— (Note: "You Don't Have to Worry" did not enter the US Billboard Hot 100, but peaked at number 44 on the US Dance Club Songs chart.)	—	—	—	77	—	—	—	—	—	—		Remix to Sing
"My Lovin' (You're Never Gonna Get It)"	1992	2	1	36	17	10	23	9	10	11	16	4	RIAA: Gold; BPI: Silver	Funky Divas
"Giving Him Something He Can Feel"	1992	6	1	84	—	19	46	23	45	2	—	44	RIAA: Gold	Funky Divas
"Yesterday" (Note: Did not chart on the Billboard Hot 100 nor the Hot R&B/Hip-Hop Songs charts (Billboard rules at the time prevented album cuts from charting).)	1992	— (Note: "Yesterday" did not enter the US Billboard Hot 100, but peaked at number 73 on the US Radio Songs chart.)		—	—	—	—	—	—	—	—	—		Funky Divas
"Free Your Mind"	1992	8	23	39	37	19	—	23	15	12	—	16	RIAA: Gold	Funky Divas
"Give It Up, Turn It Loose"	1992	15	16	96	—	36	—	30	—	34	36	22		Funky Divas
"Love Don't Love You"	1993	36	31	—	—	—	—	—	—	—	—	64		Funky Divas
"Runaway Love"	1993	51	15	62	—	24	—	—	46	—	—	36		Runaway Love
"What Is Love"	1993	— (Note: "What Is Love" did not enter the US Billboard Hot 100, but peaked at number 6 on the US Dance Club Songs chart.)		—	—	—	—	—	—	—	—	—		Runaway Love
"Whatta Man" (with Salt-N-Pepa)	1993	3	3	2	34	15	39	12	15	10	—	7	RIAA: Platinum; ARIA: Platinum; BPI: Gold; RMNZ: Platinum	Runaway Love
"Don't Let Go (Love)"	1996	2	1	3	4	23	7	3	2	10	4	5	RIAA: Platinum; ARIA: Gold; BPI: Platinum; BVMI: Gold; IFPI SWI : Gold; NVPI: Gold; RMNZ: Platinum	Set It Off and EV3
"Whatever"	1997	16	8	77	—	8	92	—	63	24	—	14	RIAA: Gold	EV3
"Too Gone, Too Long"	1997	33	25	134	—	—	—	—	45	39	—	20		EV3
"No Fool No More"	1998	57	37	—	—	—	—	—	—	34	—	—		Why Do Fools Fall in Love
"Hold On (Remix)"	1998	—	—	—	—	—	—	—	—	—	—	53		Best of En Vogue
"—" denotes a recording that did not chart or was not released in that territory.

==== 2000–present ====
Title	Year	Peak chart positions									Album
Title	Year	US	US Adult R&B	AUS	BEL (FL)	FRA	GER	NLD	SWI	UK	Album
"Riddle"	2000	92	28	125	15	22	62	28	56	33	Masterpiece Theatre
"Losin' My Mind"	2004	—	39	—	—	—	—	—	—	—	Soul Flower
"Ooh Boy"	2004	—	22	—	—	—	—	—	—	—	Soul Flower
"I'll Cry Later"	2011	—	—	—	—	—	—	—	—	—	Rufftown Presents En Vogue
"Deja Vu"	2016	—	—	—	—	—	—	—	—	—	Electric Café
"I'm Good"	2017	—	—	—	—	—	—	—	—	—	Electric Café
"Have a Seat" (featuring Snoop Dogg)	2017	—	—	—	—	—	—	—	—	—	Electric Café
"Rocket"	2017	—	8	—	—	—	—	—	—	—	Electric Café
"Reach 4 Me"	2018	—	16	—	—	—	—	—	—	—	Electric Café
"—" denotes a recording that did not chart or was not released in that territory.

=== As featured performer ===
Title	Year	Peak chart positions					Album
Title	Year	US	US R&B /HH	BEL (FL)	GER	UK	Album
"Freedom (Theme from Panther)" (with Various Artists)	1995	45	18	—	—	—	Panther
"Free Your Mind" (Sub7even featuring En Vogue)	2002	—	—	—	71	—	Free Your Mind
"So What the Fuss" (Stevie Wonder featuring En Vogue and Prince)	2005	96	34	—	—	19	A Time to Love
"Glamorous" (Natalia featuring En Vogue)	2007	—	—	2	—	—	Everything and More
"I Got You (Always and Forever) " (Chance The Rapper featuring Ari Lennox, Kierra Sheard, and En Vogue)	2019	—	—	—	—	—	The Big Day
"Bring Back the Time" (New Kids on the Block featuring Salt-N-Pepa, Rick Astley, and En Vogue)	2022	—	—	—	—	—	Non-album single
"—" denotes a recording that did not chart or was not released in that territory.

=== Promotional singles ===
Title	Year	Album
"Emotions"	2015	Non-album singles
"A Thousand Times"	2016	Non-album singles
"O Holy Night"	2016	Non-album singles
"Luv My Thangz"	2018	Non-album singles

== Guest appearances ==
List of non-single guest appearances, showing year released and album name
Title	Year	Other artist(s)	Album	Ref.
"Someday My Prince Will Come/One Song"	1991	—N/a	Simply Mad About the Mouse	
"National Anthem"	1992	—N/a	Modern A Capella	
"You Are the Man"	1997	—N/a	Soul Food	
"Lovin' You (Easy)"	2002	—N/a	Deliver Us from Eva	
"How Deep Is Your Love"	2003	—N/a	Church: Songs of Soul and Inspiration	
"Ez-A-Lee"	2004	—N/a	My Baby's Daddy	
"Emotions"	2014	—N/a	An En Vogue Christmas	
"A Thousand Times"	2014	—N/a	An En Vogue Christmas	
"O Holy Night"	2014	—N/a	An En Vogue Christmas	
"Runaway Love Remix"	2018	Erick Sermon	Green Eyed Remixes 2	

== Music videos ==
Title	Year	Director(s)
"Hold On"	1990	Tarsem Singh
"Lies"	1990	David Kellogg
"You Don't Have to Worry"	1990	Mark Romanek
"Don't Go"	1991	D.J. Webster
"My Lovin' (You're Never Gonna Get It)"	1992	Matthew Rolston
"Giving Him Something He Can Feel"	1992	Stephan Wuernitzer
"Free Your Mind"	1992	Mark Romanek
"Give It Up, Turn It Loose"	1992	Marcus Nispel
"Runaway Love"	1993	Markus Blunder
"Whatta Man"	1993	Matthew Rolston
"Freedom (Theme from Panther)"	1995	Antoine Fuqua
"Don't Let Go (Love)"	1996	Matthew Rolston
"Whatever"	1997	Matthew Rolston
"Too Gone, Too Long"	1997	Francis Lawrence
"Riddle"	2000	Len Wiseman
"Free Your Mind"	2002	Robert Bröllochs
"So What the Fuss"	2005	Paul Hunter
"Rocket"	2018	Damien Sandoval
"Bring Back the Time"	2022	John Asher
