= The Very Best of En Vogue =

Greatest hits album by En Vogue
- Released: August 21, 2001
- Recorded: 1989–1999
- Genre: R&B
- Length: 73:14
- Label: Elektra Entertainment Group/Rhino Entertainment Company
- Producer: Barry "RockBarry" Benson

En Vogue chronology
| Masterpiece Theatre (2000) | The Very Best of En Vogue (2001) | The Gift of Christmas (2002) |

The Very Best of En Vogue is a 2001 greatest hits album by En Vogue, containing hits from their three studio albums, Born to Sing, Funky Divas, and EV3.

== Critical reception ==
Professional ratings
Review scores
| Source | Rating |
|---|---|
| AllMusic | 4.5/5 stars |
| The Encyclopedia of Popular Music | 4/5 stars |
| The Rolling Stone Album Guide | 4/5 stars |

AllMusic editor Stephen Thomas Erlewine rated the album four and a half out of five stars. He noted that while "En Vogue may not have been as visionary as TLC, but they were still one of the best female urban groups of the '90s, which is why their Very Best collection works so well. This collection [...] offers the best encapsulation of their talents imaginable."

== Commercial performance ==
The Very Best of En Vogue debuted and peaked at number 29 on the UK R&B Albums Charts.

== Track listing ==
| No. | Title | Writer (s) | Length |
|---|---|---|---|
| 1. | "Hold On" | Thomas McElroy, Denzil Foster, Terry Ellis, Cindy Herron, Maxine Jones, Dawn Robinson | 5:04 |
| 2. | "Free Your Mind" | McElroy, Foster | 4:53 |
| 3. | "My Lovin' (You're Never Gonna Get It)" | McElroy, Foster | 4:41 |
| 4. | "Don't Let Go (Love)" | Ray Murray, Rico Wade, Andrea Martin, Ivan Matias, Marqueze Ethridge | 4:50 |
| 5. | "Give It Up, Turn It Loose" | McElroy, Foster | 5:12 |
| 6. | "Whatta Man" (with Salt-N-Pepa) | Hurby Azor, Dave Crawford, Cheryl James | 4:56 |
| 7. | "Lies" | McElroy, Foster, Ellis, Herron, Jones, Robinson, Khayree Shaheed | 4:17 |
| 8. | "Whatever" | Giuliano Franco, Keith Andes | 4:21 |
| 9. | "Love Don't Love You" | McElroy, Foster | 3:58 |
| 10. | "You Don't Have to Worry" | McElroy, Foster | 3:48 |
| 11. | "Waitin' on You" | McElroy, Foster | 5:12 |
| 12. | "Runaway Love" (featuring FMob) | McElroy, Foster | 5:01 |
| 13. | "Giving Him Something He Can Feel" | Curtis Mayfield | 3:55 |
| 14. | "Don't Go" | McElroy, Foster | 5:48 |
| 15. | "Let It Flow" | Foster, McElroy | 5:37 |
| 16. | "Hold On (Hip Hop Remix)" | McElroy, Foster, Ellis, Herron, Jones, Robinson | 5:50 |

== Credits ==
- Lead Vocal, Backing Vocal: Terry Ellis, Dawn Robinson, Cindy Herron, Maxine Jones
- Producer: Kenneth "Babyface" Edmonds (tracks: 8)
- Producer: Ivan Matias, Organized Noize (tracks: 4)
- Producer: Hurby "luvbug" Azor (tracks: 6)
- Producer: Denzil Foster and Thomas McElroy

== Charts ==
| Chart (2002) | Peak position |
|---|---|
| UK R&B Albums (Official Charts) | 29 |

== Certifications ==
| Region | Certification | Certified units/sales |
|---|---|---|
| New Zealand (RMNZ) | Gold | 7,500^{‡} |
| United Kingdom (BPI) | Silver | 60,000^{‡} |
^{‡} Sales+streaming figures based on certification alone.
