= Remix to Sing =

EP by En Vogue
- Released: November 26, 1991
- Recorded: March–April, 1991
- Studio: Starlight (Lake City, Fla.)
- Length: 37:00
- Label: East West
- Producer: Denzil Foster & Thomas McElroy

En Vogue chronology
Born to Sing (1990)	Remix to Sing (1991)	Funky Divas (1992)

Professional ratings
Review scores
Source	Rating
AllMusic	3/5 stars
The Rolling Stone Album Guide	3/5 stars

Remix to Sing is a 1991 EP by American female vocal group En Vogue. It is their first remix album which was released on November 26, 1991, by East West Records. The EP features remixes of songs from their platinum debut album Born to Sing. Also included are the three hit singles; "Hold On", "You Don't Have to Worry" and "Lies" which all peaked at No. 1 on Billboard's Hot R&B Songs chart.

== Track listing ==
All songs written and produced by Denzil Foster and Thomas Elroy, except noted otherwise.

No.	Title	Writer(s)	Producer(s)	Length
1.	"Hold On (Hip Hop Remix)"	Foster; McElroy; En Vogue	Denzil Foster; Thomas McElroy; Marley Marl	5:27
2.	"Lies (New Jack Remix)" (featuring Debbie T.)	Foster; McElroy; En Vogue	Foster; McElroy; Eddie F; Dave "Jam" Hall	5:43
3.	"You Don't Have to Worry (Club Mix)"	Foster; McElroy	Foster; McElroy; Frankie Knuckles	7:38
4.	"Strange (House Remix)"	Foster; McElroy; En Vogue	Foster; McElroy; Steve "Silk" Hurley	6:39
5.	"Time Goes On (Dance Remix)"	Foster; McElroy; En Vogue	Foster; McElroy; Martin Van Blockson	5:49
6.	"Silent Nite (Happy Holiday Mix)"	Chuckii Booker	Foster; McElroy; David Koenig	5:21

Japan Edition bonus track
No.	Title	Writer(s)	Producer(s)	Length
7.	"Mover"	Taugutashi Gato; Brian P. Taylor	Foster; McElroy	3:46

== Personnel ==
- Vocals, lead vocals, backing vocals, vocals [dialogues] – Cindy Herron, Dawn Robinson, Maxine Jones, Terry Ellis
- Keyboards [additional], percussion [additional] – Eric Kupper
- Engineer – Stephen Seltzer
- Piano – Terry Burrus
- Engineer – Everett Ramos
- Remix [producer] – Steve Hurley, Dave Hall, Frankie Knuckles, Chuckii Booker, Eddie F, Martin Van Blockson & Marley Marl
- Vocals [dialogues], keyboards, drum machine [programming] – Denzil Foster, Thomas McElroy
- Vocals [rap] – Debbie T (tracks: 2)
- Producer, arranger, composer – Denzil Foster, Thomas McElroy
