= Strange (En Vogue song) =

Single by En Vogue

from the album Remix to Sing
- Released: October 9, 1991
- Recorded: August 1989–September 1991
- Genre: R&B
- Length: 4:04
- Label: Atlantic
- Songwriter(s): Thomas McElroy; Denzil Foster; EnVogue
- Producer(s): Denzil Foster; Thomas McElroy

En Vogue singles chronology
"Don't Go" (1991)	"Strange" (1991)	"My Lovin' (You're Never Gonna Get It)" (1992)

"Strange" is a 1991 song by American vocal girl group En Vogue, and appears on their first compilation album, Remix to Sing (1991). The song features Maxine Jones and Dawn Robinson on lead vocals. It is known as "Strange (House Remix)", the original version is from their debut album, Born to Sing (1990). A commercial single was never officially released, the song was only serviced to dance clubs in the US and UK. It peaked at number 44 on the US Billboard Dance Club Songs chart. It was their final single from the album.

== Critical reception ==
Edward Hill from The Plain Dealer noted that the song "swings on the new-jack tip". David Quantick from Smash Hits described it as "slow" and "velvety" in his review of Born to Sing.

== Charts ==
Chart (1991)	Peak position
US Dance Club Songs (Billboard)	44
