= Soul Flower =

Studio album by En Vogue
- Released: February 24, 2004
- Recorded: 2003–2004
- Genre: R&B
- Label: 33rd Street; Bayside
- Producer: Foster & McElroy; Mo Benjamin; Jara Harris; Troy Johnson; Marlon McClain; Dave Meyers; Dwayne Morgan; Phillips Scott; Matt Theriault; Track Headz

En Vogue chronology
The Gift of Christmas (2002)	Soul Flower (2004)	Electric Café (2018)

Singles from Soul Flower
- 1. "Losin' My Mind" Released: December 2003; 2. "Ooh Boy" Released: February 2004

Soul Flower is the sixth studio album by the American recording group En Vogue. Released through 33rd Street and Funkigirl Records and distributed by Bayside Entertainment on February 24, 2004, in the United States, the album marked the band's debut with the label as well as their first full-length release to feature vocals by new band member Rhona Bennett who had joined remaining founding members Terry Ellis and Cindy Herron the year before following the departure of Amanda Cole, resulting into the partial re-recording of several songs on Soul Flower that Cole had originally lent her voice to.

The trio reteamed with longtime contributors Denzil Foster and Thomas McElroy to work on most of the album, with additional production coming from Troy Johnson, Dwayne Morgan, Phillips Scott, Marlon McClain, and songwriting collective Trackheadz. Upon its release, Soul Flower debuted at number 47 on the US Billboard Top R&B/Hip-Hop Albums and number 15 on the Independent Albums charts, making it the band's lowest-chart album to date. In support of it, two singles, including "Losin' My Mind" and "Ooh Boy", were released.

== Background ==
In 2000, En Vogue released their fourth studio album Masterpiece Theatre, their second project as a trio following the departure of original member Dawn Robinson in 1997. A commercial disappointment, it underperformed and was considered a drop from their previous effort EV3 (1997), resulting in the release of no further singles after the weak commercial performance of the project. Instead, En Vogue were soon dropped from Elektra. The following year, Amanda Cole was added as a performing member to the band, but soon after original member Maxine Jones announced her desire to spend more time with her young daughter and departed. Soon after, the band collaborated with producer Timothy Eaton on the Christmas album The Gift of Christmas, released through Eaton's Discretion Records in 2002.

2004 marked the return of En Vogue with a new album and a new lineup. Original members Terry Ellis and Cindy Herron are joined by new member, actress and singer Rhona Bennett. Bennett replaced Amanda Cole who recorded ten of the fifteen tracks with Herron and Ellis; these would later be re-recorded with Bennett who replaced all of Cole's leads on the album. Five additional tracks were then added to complete the album. The song "Stop" as well as the lead single "Losin' My Mind" were brought in by Bennett, "Ez-a-Lee" was an additional track added by the group's new management, while "Ooh Boy" and "New Day Calling'" were brought to the project by the record company.

== Release and reception ==
Professional ratings
Review scores
Source	Rating
AllMusic	4/5 stars
Ebony	3/5 stars
USA Today	2.5/4 stars

Soul Flower received generally mixed reviews from music critics. David Jeffries from AllMusic felt that the album "benefits from more of an eye on the groove than on the charts and better than ever tricks from longtime producers Denzil Foster and Thomas McElroy." He added that while "this isn't a return to form [...] Soul Flower finds the band revitalized, learned, and with a whole new set of opportunities in front of them." In his review for USA Today, Steve Jones described the album as "a more mature, soulful outfit. The harmonies are as pristine as ever, and they are still putting lame guys in check, but they seem to have mellowed a bit."

Following its release, Soul Flower debuted at number 47 on Billboard's Top R&B/Hip-Hop Albums and number 15 on the Independent Albums chart in the United States. It became the En Vogue's first album neither to reach the top forty of the former not to chart on the Billboard 200. Altogether, Soul Flower produced two singles, including "Losin' My Mind" and "Ooh Boy," the latter of which reached Billboard's Bubbling Under charts.

== Track listing ==
No.	Title	Writer(s)	Producer(s)	Length
1.	"Losin' My Mind"	Andre Merritt; Rhona Bennett; Troy Johnson	Johnson	3:13
2.	"Ez-A-Lee"	Dwayne Morgan; Phillips Scott	Morgan; Scott	3:03
3.	"Ooh Boy"	Denzil Foster; Jamie Brewer; Kisha Griffin; Thomas McElroy	Foster & McElroy	3:33
4.	"All You See"	Foster; Michael Marshall; McElroy	Foster & McElroy	3:29
5.	"Dissed Him"	Cindy Herron; Foster; Terry Ellis; Dave Meyers; McElroy; Benjamin	Benjamin; Meyers	4:29
6.	"Ooh La La"	Curtis Wilson; Eric Baker; Robbie Nevelle; Rochad Holiday	Track Headz	3:38
7.	"I Do Love You (Piece of My Love)"	Aaron Hall; Gene Griffin; Teddy Riley; Timmy Gatling	Foster & McElroy	4:24
8.	"Stop"	Foster; Scott; Bennett; McElroy	Foster & McElroy	2:51
9.	"Heaven"	Herron; Foster; Ellis; McElroy	Foster & McElroy	4:01
10.	"Everyday"	Billy Eylle; Curtis Mayfield; Dillon Gorman	Foster & McElroy	4:16
11.	"Nearly Lost"	Arvel McClinton; Curtis Wilson; Ngai McGee	Trackheadz	3:12
12.	"Million Different Ways"	John Webb; Marlon McClain; Matt Theriault	McClain; Theriault	3:29
13.	"Careful"	Herron; Foster; Jara Harris; McClain; Ellis; McElroy	Harris; McClain	3:02
14.	"How Do I Get Over"	Foster; Marshall; McElroy	Foster & McElroy	4:06
15.	"New Day Callin'"	Dorian Cheah; Robert Ventura	Foster & McElroy	4:11

== Personnel ==
Credits are taken from the album's liner notes.

- Vocals – Cindy Herron, Terry Ellis, Rhona Bennett
- Drum Programming – Denzil Foster, Dillion Gorman, Jara Harris, Phillip Scott, Sauce, Thomas McElroy, Troy Johnson
- Guitar – Dwayne Wiggins, Earl Cooney, Kenya, Markus Henderson, Marlon McClain, Steve Counter
- Electric Bass – Jaime Brewer
- Violin – Dorian Cheah
- Engineer – Phillip Scott, Steve Counter
- Keyboards – Denzil Foster, Dillion Gorman, Jara Harris, Matt Theriault, Phillip Scott, Robbi Nevell, Rochad Holiday, Sauce, Thomas McElroy, Troy Johnson
- Percussion – Ricky Cambell
- Executive producer – Cindy Herron, Denzil Foster, Terry Ellis, Thomas McElroy
- Producer – Denzil Foster & Thomas McElroy, Troy Johnson, Dwayne Morgan, Dave Meyers, Mo Benjamin, Marlon McClain & Matt Theriault, Jara Harris

== Charts ==
Chart (2004)	Peak position
US Independent Albums (Billboard)	15
US Top R&B/Hip-Hop Albums (Billboard)	47
