= Riddle (song) =

2000 single by En Vogue

Single by En Vogue

from the album Masterpiece Theatre
- Released: March 22, 2000
- Length: 4:04
- Label: Elektra
- Songwriters: Denzil Foster; Thomas McElroy; Cindy Herron; Maxine Jones; Terry Ellis
- Producer: Foster & McElroy

En Vogue singles chronology
"No Fool No More" (1998)	"Riddle" (2000)	"Losin' My Mind" (2004)

Audio
- "Riddle" on YouTube

"Riddle" is a song by American R&B group En Vogue. It was written by Denzil Foster and Thomas McElroy, along with band members Cindy Herron, Maxine Jones, and Terry Ellis, for their fourth studio album Masterpiece Theater (2000), while production was helmed by Foster & McElroy. An angry mid-tempo song about a sneaking, cheating lover, "Riddle" is built around a clapping game motif, and interpolates the band's 1992 song "My Lovin' (You're Never Gonna Get It)." Lyrically, it has the protagonist revealing her feelings about discovering that her love interest is having an affair with someone else over the course of the week.

En Vogue performed "Riddle" on several shows, including The Rosie O'Donnell Show and The Tonight Show with Jay Leno. "Riddle" was the last single to feature Maxine Jones before she left to make more time for her family. In 2008, all four original members reunited to perform at a music award show. The group also performed it at several shows during their "20th Anniversary Tour" in 2009, with Dawn Robinson reuniting with Cindy, Terry and Maxine with Dawn performing the second half of Maxine's verse.

== Critical reception ==
Upon its release, "Riddle" received a mixed to positive reception from music critics. In his reviews of parent album Masterpiece Theater, Michael Paoletta from Billboard declared the song a "percolating single which unfolds like a direct descendant of the trio's past hits. His colleague Chuck Taylor felt that "Riddle" was another smash track from the band, thought he noted that while it "does have the group's signature sound, it also seems dated." He compared "Riddle" with the band's 1992 single "My Lovin' (You're Never Gonna Get It)" whose instrumentation is interpolated near the end of the song.

== Chart performance ==
Norwegian record producing and songwriting team Stargate, composed of Tor Erik Hermansen and Mikkel Storleer Eriksen, was consulted to produce a radio edit of "Riddle," which contains even more elements of "My Lovin' (You're Never Gonna Get It)". Additional remixes were provided by Tricky Stewart and Maurice Joshua. Commercially, though, the song failed to become a hit in the United States. "Riddle" was more popular overseas, reaching top 30 in the United Kingdom, while entering the top thirty in the Benelux states.

== Music video ==
An accompanying music video was directed by Len Wiseman.

== Track listings ==
All tracks written by Denzil Foster, Thomas McElroy, Cindy Herron, Maxine Jones, and Terry Ellis.

UK CD maxi single
No.	Title	Producer(s)	Length
1.	"Riddle" (StarGate Radio Mix)	Foster & McElroy; Stargate^{[a]}	4:15
2.	"Riddle" (Red Zone Remix Edit)	Foster & McElroy; Tricky Stewart^{[a]}	4:08
3.	"Riddle" (Club Remix Edit)	Foster & McElroy; Maurice Joshua^{[a]}	4:00
4.	"Riddle" (Radio Edit)	Foster & McElroy	4:11

US 12-inch single
No.	Title	Producer(s)	Length
1.	"Riddle" (Album Version)	Foster & McElroy	4:04
2.	"Riddle" (Radio Edit)	Foster & McElroy	4:11
3.	"Riddle" (Red Zone Remix Edit)	Foster & McElroy; Stewart^{[a]}	4:08
4.	"Riddle" (Red Zone Remix Instrumental)	Foster & McElroy; Stewart^{[a]}	4:11
5.	"Riddle" (Extended Club Remix)	Foster & McElroy; Joshua^{[a]}	4:15
6.	"Riddle" (Club Remix Instrumental)	Foster & McElroy; Joshua^{[a]}	4:08
7.	"Riddle" (Album Version Instrumental)	Foster & McElroy	4:04
8.	"Riddle" (Album Version Acapella)	Foster & McElroy	4:03

Notes

- ^{^[a]} denotes additional producer(s)

== Personnel ==
- Steve Counter – recording engineer
- James Early – guitar
- Terry Ellis – vocalist, writer
- Denzil Foster – instruments, producer, writer
- Cindy Herron – vocalist, writer
- Maxine Jones – vocalist, writer
- Ken Kessie – mixing engineer
- Thomas McElroy – instruments, producer, writer

== Charts ==
=== Weekly charts ===
Weekly chart performance for "Riddle"
Chart (2000)	Peak position
Australia (ARIA)	125
Belgium (Ultratop 50 Flanders)	15
Belgium (Ultratop 50 Wallonia)	24
Croatia (HRT)	1
Europe (Eurochart Hot 100 Singles)	35
France (SNEP)	22
Germany (GfK)	62
Netherlands (Dutch Top 40)	28
Netherlands (Single Top 100)	28
Scotland Singles (Official Charts)	63
Switzerland (Schweizer Hitparade)	56
UK Singles (Official Charts)	33
UK Dance (Official Charts)	20
UK Hip Hop/R&B (Official Charts)	8
UK Urban Top 20 (Music Week)	15
US Billboard Hot 100	92
US Hot R&B/Hip-Hop Songs (Billboard)	95
US Pop Airplay (Billboard)	35
US Rhythmic Airplay (Billboard)	32

=== Year-end charts ===
Year-end chart performance for "Riddle"
Chart (2000)	Position
Belgium (Ultratop 50 Flanders)	77
Belgium (Ultratop 50 Wallonia)	86

== Release history ==
Release dates and formats for "Riddle"
Region	Date	Format(s)	Label	Ref.
United States	March 22, 2000	CD single	Elektra	
United States	April 4, 2000	Contemporary hit; rhythmic contemporary; urban adult contemporary radio	Elektra	
Germany	May 1, 2000	CD single; maxi single	Elektra	
New Zealand	June 12, 2000	CD single; cassette single	Elektra	
United Kingdom	June 19, 2000	12-inch single; CD single; cassette single	Elektra	
