= Keep Your Money =

Keep Your Money may refer to:

- "Keep Your Money", a song by En Vogue from EV3 (1997)
- "Keep Your Money", a song by Jussie Smollett from season one of Empire (2015)
