= The Gift of Christmas (En Vogue album) =

Studio album by En Vogue
- Released: October 8, 2002
- Recorded: 2002
- Genre: Pop; R&B; Christmas
- Length: 41:24
- Label: Discretion
- Producer: Foster & McElroy

En Vogue chronology
Masterpiece Theatre (2000)	The Gift of Christmas (2002)	Soul Flower (2004)

The Gift of Christmas is the fifth studio album and the Christmas album by American female recording group En Vogue, released on October 8, 2002 by Discretion Enterprises following their departure from Elektra Records. Produced and arranged by long time collaborators Thomas McElroy and Denzil Foster, featuring additional production by Timothy Eaton, it is the group's first Christmas album and their first record to feature vocals from Amanda Cole who remained two years with the group. The Gift of Christmas features original Christmas tunes as well as cover versions of classic holiday songs.

== Background ==
In 2000, En Vogue released their fourth studio album Masterpiece Theatre to commercial disappointment. The album debuted and peaked at number 33 on the US Billboard Top R&B/Hip-Hop Albums chart and at number 67 on the Billboard 200, marking their lowest peak for an album by then and was a considerable drop from their previous effort EV3 (1997). "Riddle," the album's only single, also failed to impact, resulting in the release of no further singles after Elektra Records refused to release the album’s second single, "Love U Crazay"." Instead, En Vogue were soon dropped from Elektra after the weak commercial performance of the project.

In 2001, Amanda Cole was added as a performing member to the band, but soon after original member Maxine Jones announced her desire to spend more time with her young daughter and departed, leaving them as a trio again. Around the same time, produced Timothy Eaton approached the band when he was interested in doing a Christmas album with them through Discretion Records. While Eaton and David Sterling served as executive producers on the album, En Vogue reteamed with their founders, production duo Foster & McElroy, to record the album, featuring four original songs and eight cover versions of Christmas standards and carols. In 2017, when asked about its creation process, Cindy Herron commented that "the album was sort of, I don't want to say it was an experiment, but in a way it was."

== Track listing ==
All tracks produced by Foster & McElroy.

The Gift of Christmas – Standard edition
No.	Title	Writer(s)	Length
1.	"Oh Christmas Tree Greeting"	Traditional	0:46
2.	"I Saw Mommy Kissing Santa Claus"	Traditional	2:22
3.	"Have Yourself a Merry Little Christmas"	Traditional	3:07
4.	"Jingle Bells" (Euro Mix)	Traditional	2:52
5.	"Snowy Nights"	Denzil Foster; Thomas McElroy; Tony Woods; En Vogue	3:16
6.	"My Christmas"	Foster; McElroy; En Vogue	3:37
7.	"Merry Christmas Baby"	Traditional	4:14
8.	"This Christmas"	Foster; McElroy; En Vogue	3:37
9.	"That's What Christmas Means to Me"	Traditional	2:32
10.	"With My Honey"	Foster; McElroy; En Vogue	3:46
11.	"Oh Holy Night"	Traditional	3:12
12.	"What Child Is This?" (Prayer)	Traditional	1:37
13.	"What Child Is This?" (Vocal)		2:14

The Gift of Christmas – Bonus track edition
No.	Title	Writer(s)	Length
14.	"Jingle Bells" (Rock Version)	Traditional	3:00
15.	"Jingle Bells" (Instrumental Version)	Traditional	2:52

== Personnel ==
- Cindy Herron Briggs – lead and backing vocals
- Terry Ellis – lead and backing vocals
- Amanda Cole – lead and backing vocals
- Big Baby – string arrangements
- Jamie Brewer – bass
- Tracy Arrington – bass
- Mark Welling – drums
- Howard Mostrum – engineer
- Tony Woods – composer, drum programming, keyboard programming
- Jillian Baskerville – choir, chorus
- Geraldine P. Andrews – choir, chorus
- Timothy Eaton – arranger, choir conductor, executive producer, producer
- Ben Arrindell – remix, engineer, mixing
- Steve Counter – engineer, mixer
- Denzil Foster – composer, drum programming, keyboard programming, producer
- Thomas McElroy – composer, drum programming, keyboard programming, producer
- Denzil Foster – producer
- Thomas McElroy – producer
- Timothy Eaton – producer
