= Masterpiece Theatre (En Vogue album) =

Studio album by En Vogue
- Released: May 23, 2000
- Recorded: September 1999 – March 2000
- Label: Elektra
- Producer: Denzil Foster; Thomas McElroy; Mo Benjamin; Mark Elliott; Wayne Jackson; Mark Lomax; Michael J. Mani; Marlon McClain; Dave Meeze

En Vogue chronology
EV3 (1997)	Masterpiece Theatre (2000)	The Gift of Christmas (2002)

Singles from Masterpiece Theatre
- 1. "Riddle" Released: March 22, 2000

Masterpiece Theatre is the fourth studio album by American recording group En Vogue, released worldwide by Elektra Records on May 23, 2000. It marked the band's debut with Elektra, as well as their only release following their departure from longtime label Eastwest Records. Terry Ellis, Cindy Herron, and Maxine Jones worked exclusively with regular collaborators Denzil Foster and Thomas McElroy on the album who made heavy use of samples from classical music and traditional pop music to construct songs for Masterpiece Theatre, with its title alluding to the same-titled American drama anthology television series, best known for presenting adaptations of a mix of contemporary and classic novels and biographies.

Upon its release, Masterpiece Theatre received mixed reviews from critics, who acclaimed the group for their vocal performances on the songs but were divided by the overall sound of the album. A commercial disappointment, it reached number 33 on Billboard's Top R&B/Hip-Hop Albums chart and number 67 on the Billboard 200, becoming En Vogue's first album not to enter the top ten on either chart in the United States. Masterpiece Theatre saw similar success in international territories, where it reached the top thirty in Germany and Switzerland only, resulting in the release of no further singles next to "Riddle" and their departure from Elektra Records.

== Background ==
In 1997, En Vogue released their third album EV3. The band's first album as a trio after the departure of original member Dawn Robinson, it received mixed reviews from critics, but while it became a success it failed to live up to full commercial expectation. In preparation for their next album, remaining members Terry Ellis, Cindy Herron, and Maxine Jones reteamed with their founders, duo Denzil Foster and Thomas McElroy to work on new songs. With the intention of recording "off-guard" material, the producers took famous classical music from Pyotr Ilyich Tchaikovsky, Ludwig van Beethoven, and Sergei Rachmaninoff, mixing them with contemporary R&B and pop elements. Originally set to be titled Something Old, Something New, Something Borrowed, Something Cool, the album was later retitled Masterpiece Theatre, alluding to the same-titled drama anthology television series, known for presenting adaptations of contemporary and classic novels and biographies. An accompanying sampler album, released in advance of the album's release, included the songs "It's On" and "I Love You More", the latter of which interpolated Nino Rota's "The Godfather Theme." However, due to uncleared sampling, both songs were excluded from the final revised album release.

== Critical reception ==
Professional ratings
Review scores
Source	Rating
AllMusic	4/5 stars
Robert Christgau	(neither)
Entertainment Weekly	C
Los Angeles Times	2/4 stars
NME	7/10
Q	4/5 stars
Rolling Stone	3/5 stars
Spin	6/10
USA Today	3/4 stars

Masterpiece Theatre received generally mixed reviews from music critics. Q called the album "magnificent" and was positive towards its approach by integrating unpredictable classical, adding that "cleverly, they have spotted that classical music is more versatile than George Clinton and James Brown interpolations." AllMusic editor Stacia Proefrock gave Masterpiece Theatre four out of five stars and considered the album an improvement over previous album EV3 (1997), calling it "clever and classy at the same time." Commenting on En Vogue's progression with Masterpiece Theatre, she noted that "the silky-smooth harmonies are still there, combined with forceful solos and sassy and intelligent lyrics." British music journalism magazine NME declared the sample-heavy results as "spectacular and deranged and even once the bow-tie operatics are over they stay inventive [...] Their absence of attitude in the lyrics lets them sound formulaic [...] but nobody can beat En Vogue for vocal technique, and the rhapsodic experiments are neo-camp genius."

Rolling Stone wrote that with Masterpiece Theatre "En Vogue still put on one hell of an act," noting that "the trio can be both polished and down-to-earth," while "lacing smooth R&B tracks with feisty lyrics." Billboard journalist Michael Paoletta commented that the album takes "the listener on a journey paved with classic soul rhythms and sleek pop melodies." While complimenting it for its vocal performances and good fun, he also stated that the album "feels a bit restrained in the age of freewheeling, tooth-suckin' tunes", that would make "it never really as much fun as it should be." In his review for Spin, Keith Harris felt that the album still "fulfills its campy designs." Less impressed, Matt Diehl, writing for Entertainment Weekly, found that "replacing their funky-diva exuberance with artsy pretension (a riff on "Moonlight Sonata") and don’t-forget-us samples (from their big hit "Hold On"), En Vogue’s fourth foray Masterpiece Theater is anything but a masterpiece." Similarly, Connie Johnson from The Los Angeles Times concluded that "ever since the departure of member Dawn Robinson, En Vogue hasn't sounded like the girl-group innovator it was for much of the '90s – and this isn't the comeback album it needs to be." Brent Faisons from Vibe wrote: "Though the commercially technical quality of their voices cannot be denied, [...] their music sounds contrived and unconvincing."

== Chart performance ==
In the United States, Masterpiece Theatre debuted and peaked at number 33 on the Billboard Top R&B/Hip-Hop Albums chart and at number 67 on the Billboard 200 in the issue dated June 10, 2000. This marked En Vogue's lowest peak for an album by then and was a considerable drop from their previous effort EV3 (1997) which had opened at number eight on the Billboard 200 to their biggest first week sales by then. Internationally, the album failed to enter the top 40 on the majority of the few charts it appeared on. It however, reached number 22 and number 28 of the German and Swiss Albums Charts, where it ranks among the band's highest peaks in both countries. In Canada, New Zealand, and the United Kingdom, where previous albums had charted to certified sales, Masterpiece Theatre became En Vogue's first album to miss the album charts.

== Singles ==
The album was preceded by lead single "Riddle", which was issued to radio in a remixed form produced by Norwegian production duo Stargate. While it became a top thirty hit in several European countries, including Belgium, France, and the Netherlands, "Riddle" failed to impact elsewhere, resulting in lackluster sales of its parent album and the release of no further singles after Elektra Records refused to release the album’s second single, "Love U Crazay," after the weak commercial performance of the project. Instead, En Vogue were soon dropped from Elektra Records, with subsequent albums such as The Gift of Christmas (2002) and Soul Flower (2004) released on independent labels.

== Track listing ==
No.	Title	Writer(s)	Producer(s)	Length
1.	"Riddle"	Denzil Foster; Thomas McElroy; Terry Ellis; Cindy Herron; Maxine Jones	Foster; McElroy	5:09
2.	"No, No, No (Can't Come Back)"	Foster; McElroy; Ellis; Herron; Jones; Raymond Ransom, Jr.	Foster; McElroy	3:09
3.	"Falling in Love"	Foster; McElroy; Ellis; Herron; Jones	Foster; McElroy	4:08
4.	"Suite (Intro)" (featuring Russell Gatewood)	Gatewood	Foster; McElroy	0:26
5.	"Love U Crazay" (featuring Kamil Marzette)	Foster; McElroy; Michael J. Mani	Foster; McElroy; Mani^{[A]}	4:19
6.	"Sad But True"	Foster; McElroy; Mani	Foster; McElroy; Mani^{[A]}	4:08
7.	"Love Won't Take Me Out"	Foster; McElroy; Mani	Foster; McElroy; Mani^{[A]}	4:59
8.	"Whatever Will Be, Will Be"	Foster; McElroy; Ellis; Herron; Jones	Foster; McElroy	4:43
9.	"Suite (Outro)" (featuring Russell Gatewood)	Gatewood	Foster; McElroy	0:05
10.	"Beat of Love"	Foster; McElroy	Foster; McElroy; Wayne Jackson^{[B]}; Mark Elliott^{[B]}	4:13
11.	"Latin Soul"	Foster; McElroy; Ellis; Herron; Jones	Foster; McElroy	4:32
12.	"Work It Out"	Foster; McElroy; Ellis; Herron; Jones; Dave Meyers; B. Thompson	Foster; McElroy; Meeze^{[A]}; Mo Benjamin^{[A]}	4:27
13.	"Those Dogs" (featuring Bobby McFerrin & Eklypse)	Foster; McElroy; Ellis; Herron; Jones; Michelle Woods; Robert Page; Tony Woods	Foster; McElroy	4:09
14.	"Number One Man"	Foster; McElroy; Ellis; Herron; Jones; Marlon McClain; Mark Lomax; Curtis Mayfield	Foster; McElroy; McClain^{[A]}; Lomax^{[A]}	4:39

Japanese bonus track
No.	Title	Writer(s)	Producer(s)	Length
15.	"Riddle" (Red Zone Remix Edit)	Foster; McElroy; Ellis; Herron; Jones	Foster; McElroy; Tricky Stewart^{[C]}	4:08

Notes

- ^{^[A]} denotes co-producer
- ^{^[B]} denotes associate producer
- ^{^[C]} denotes additional producer

Sample credits

- "Riddle" contain an uncredited musical interpolation of En Vogue's "My Lovin' (You're Never Gonna Get It)"
- "No, No, No (Can't Come Back)" contains an interpolation of Brick's "Living From the Mind"
- "Falling in Love" samples Joe Sample's "In All My Wildest Dreams"
- "Love U Crazay" samples Pyotr Ilyich Tchaikovsky's "The Nutcracker, Act 2, No. 1 - Dance of the Sugarplum Fairy"
- "Sad But True" contains elements of Ludwig van Beethoven's "Moonlight Sonata"
- "Love Won't Take Me Out" samples Sergei Rachmaninoff's "Prelude in C-sharp minor (Op. 3, No. 2)"
- "Whatever Will Be, Will Be" samples Doris Day's "Que Sera, Sera (Whatever Will Be, Will Be)"
- "Those Dogs" samples Georges Bizet's "Habanera", as well as containing a lyrical interpolation from another adaptation, “Dat’s Love” from Carmen Jones by Oscar Hammerstein II
- "Number One Man" contains an interpolation of The Staple Singers's "Let's Do It Again"

== Personnel ==
- Vocals – Cindy Herron, Maxine Jones, Terry Ellis
- Electric Guitar – Dwayne Wiggins
- Bass Guitar – Jaime Brewer
- Keyboards – Sundra Manning
- Drum Programmer – Sauce
- Vocals [Dialogue] – Russell C. Gatewood
- Producer [Associate] – Dave Meyer
- Engineer – Cookhouse, Jerry Stenstadvold, Steve Genewick
- Backing Vocal Rap – Kamil Marzette
- Bass Guitar – Jaime Brewer
- Piano, Engineer – Michael J. Mani
- Drum Programmer – Dave Mezee
- Electric Guitar – James Earley
- Keyboard – Denzil Foster
- Backing Vocals Rap – Eklypse
- Backing Vocals – Bobby McFerrin
- Guitar, Engineer – Marlon McClain
- Piano, Keyboard – Thomas McElroy
- Electric Bass – Jaime Brewer
- Backing Vocals – Denzil Foster
- Backing Vocals – Thomas McElroy
- Organ – Mo Benjamin
- Engineer [Assistant] – Mike Bozzi
- Producer [Associate] – Wayne Jackson
- Producer – Mark Elliott
- Engineer [Recording] – Steve Counter
- Mastered – Brian Gardner
- Mixed – Ken Kessie
- Keyboards, Drum Programming, Engineer – Mark Lomax
- Executive-Producer – Denzil Foster, Thomas McElroy
- Drum Programming – Denzil Foster, Thomas McElroy
- Producer [Production Assistant] – Russell C. Gatewood
- Producer – Denzil Foster & Thomas McElroy

== Charts ==
Chart (2000)	Peak position
Belgian Albums (Ultratop Wallonia)	49
Dutch Albums (Album Top 100)	56
European Albums (Music & Media)	65
French Albums (SNEP)	56
German Albums (Offizielle Top 100)	22
Swiss Albums (Schweizer Hitparade)	28
UK Albums (OCC)	139
UK R&B Albums (OCC)	17
US Billboard 200	67
US Top R&B/Hip-Hop Albums (Billboard)	33
