= Lies (En Vogue song) =

- U.S. 12-inch vinyl single

Single by En Vogue

from the album Born to Sing
- Released: June 27, 1990
- Recorded: October–November 1989 (vocals); May 1990 (remix)
- Studio: Can Am Studios, CA
- Genre: R&B; dance-pop; new jack swing
- Length: 4:16 (LP Mix); 4:14 (Avant Garde Remix Edit)
- Label: Atlantic
- Songwriters: Denzil Foster; Thomas McElroy; En Vogue
- Producers: Denzil Foster; Thomas McElroy

En Vogue singles chronology
"Hold On" (1990)	"Lies" (1990)	"You Don't Have to Worry" (1990)

Music video
- "Lies" on YouTube

"Lies" is a song from American R&B/pop group En Vogue, released in June 1990 by Atlantic Records as the second single from their debut hit album, Born to Sing (1990). Written and produced by Thomas McElroy and Denzil Foster, it became the group's second single to top the US Billboard R&B singles chart. It peaked at number thirty-eight and was also their second Billboard Hot 100 and Cash Box Top 100 top-40 hit. The song is led by Dawn Robinson and Cindy Herron with ad libs from Maxine Jones and Terry Ellis on the ending vamp.

== Critical reception ==
Matthew Hocter from Albumism noted Robinson’s "incredible vocals coupled with the group’s brilliant interplay and that fresh new jill swing sound of the '90s." AllMusic editor Jose F. Promis stated that the song "proved that all members of the quartet were equally adept at handling lead vocals." Bill Coleman from Billboard magazine wrote that it "continues to emphasize sparkling harmonizing, though swinging instrumental base grooves hard." He noted that it "sounds like another major hit."

David Giles from Music Week deemed it "a more commercial track", adding, "far much of the time it sounds like a Diana Ross record, until an almost angry rap cuts in towards the end." A reviewer from The Network Forty described it as a "sophomore" single. Edward Hill from The Plain Dealer noted that it "shuffles with the Soul II Soul technique." William Shaw from Smash Hits said the track has "a brilliant, wriggly funk rhythm made up of a great chunky mixture of parping sounds and chugging guitars and it's also got those trademark En Vogue warbling harmonies."

== Music video ==
A black-and-white music video was produced to promote the single, using the Avant Garde Remix Edit directed by David Kellogg. It was later made available on En Vogue's official YouTube channel in 2015 and had generated more than 1 million views as of June 2025.

== Track listings and formats ==
- US 12"Vinyl Single
1. "Lies" (The Extended Avant Garde Remix) — 5:55
2. "Lies" (LP Mix) — 4:16
3. "Lies" (Extended Funky Remix) — 5:59
4. "Lies" (Kwame's Bonega Remix) — 4:40
- Germany CD Maxi-Single
1. "Lies" (The Avant Garde Funky Remix) — 4:15
2. "Lies" (Extended Funky Remix) — 5:59
3. "Lies" (The Extended Avant Garde Remix) — 5:42
4. "Lies" (LP Version) — 3:50

== Charts ==
=== Weekly charts ===
Chart (1990)	Peak position
Australia (ARIA)	156
Netherlands (Dutch Top 40 Tipparade)	11
Netherlands (Single Top 100)	42
UK Singles (Official Charts)	44
US Billboard Hot 100	38
US Hot R&B/Hip-Hop Songs (Billboard)	1
US Dance Club Songs (Billboard)	18
US Dance Singles Sales (Billboard)	7
US Cash Box Top 100	36

=== Year-end charts ===
Chart (1990)	Position
UK Club Chart (Record Mirror)	80
US Hot R&B/Hip-Hop Songs (Billboard)	15

== See also ==
- R&B number-one hits of 1990 (USA)
