= Don't Go (En Vogue song) =

Single by En Vogue

from the album Born to Sing
- Released: March 21, 1991
- Recorded: August 1989
- Genre: R&B
- Length: 5:48 (album version); 3:57 (radio edit)
- Label: Atlantic
- Songwriter(s): Denzil Foster; Thomas McElroy
- Producer(s): Denzil Foster; Thomas McElroy

En Vogue singles chronology
"You Don't Have to Worry" (1990)	"Don't Go" (1991)	"Strange" (1991)

Music video
- "Don't Go" (video version) by En Vogue on YouTube

Audio
- "Don't Go" (album version) by En Vogue on YouTube

"Don't Go" is a song by American group En Vogue. It was written by Denzil Foster and Thomas McElroy for their debut album Born to Sing (1990). One of the first recordings for its parent album, the song is a mid-tempo ballad informing the male lover that his female counterpart still cares for him and does not want him leave. It features a lead vocal progression by Terry Ellis displaying her vocal range. Released as the album's fourth and final single in April 1991, "Don't Go" peaked at number three on the US Billboard Hot R&B Singles chart, but failed to chart on the Billboard Hot 100.

== Critical reception ==
Matthew Hocter from Albumism described the song as a "sensual ballad pleading for a lover to stay". Also AllMusic editor Jose F. Promis noted it as "sensual" in his review of Born to Sing. Edward Hill from The Plain Dealer wrote that tracks like "Don't Go" and "Waitin' On You" "reveal a strong sensitivity to harmony and mood."

== Music video ==
A video was made in early 1991 in a Saharan desert like setting, with the group members wearing North African attire.

== Track listings and formats ==
- US Cassette Single
1. "Don't Go" (Radio Edit) — 3:54
2. "National Anthem" — 1:47
- US CD Single Promo
1. "Don't Go" (Radio Edit) — 3:54
2. "Don't Go" (Video Version) — 4:52
3. "Don't Go" (LP Version) — 5:45
4. "National Anthem" — 1:47
- UK 12"Vinyl Single
  - A1 "Don't Go" (Album Version) — 5:45
  - B1 "Hold On (Radio Version With Intro) — 5:07
  - B2 "Part of Me — 5:58
- UK 7"Vinyl Single
  - A "Don't Go" (Edit) — 3:52
  - B "Part of Me" — 5:58

== Charts ==
=== Weekly charts ===
Chart (1991)	Peak position
US Hot R&B/Hip-Hop Songs (Billboard)	3

=== Year-end charts ===
Chart (1991)	Position
US Hot R&B/Hip-Hop Songs (Billboard)	27
