= Southern Gal =

Studio album by Terry Ellis
- Released: November 14, 1995
- Length: 51:11
- Label: EastWest
- Producers: Denzil Foster; Thomas McElroy; Somethin' for the People

Southern Gal is the debut and only solo album by American singer Terry Ellis. It was released by EastWest Records on November 14, 1995 in the United States, Recorded and released during the time her group, En Vogue, went on hiatus for two years, the album includes the R&B top ten hit "Where Ever You Are."

== Promotion ==
"Where Ever You Are" was released on October 17, 1995 as the lead single from Southern Gal. It peaked at number ten on the US Hot R&B/Hip-Hop Songs, while also reaching number 52 on the US Billboard Hot 100, becoming the album's highest-charting single. "What Did I Do To You?" was issued by EastWest Records as the album's second and final single. Less successful than "Where Ever You Are", it spent 10 weeks on the Hot R&B/Hip-Hop Songs chart, peaking at number 41.

== Critical reception ==
Professional ratings
Review scores
Source	Rating
AllMusic	2/5 stars
Muzik	3.5/5 stars

Senior editor Stephen Thomas Erlewine from AllMusic found that while Southern Gal "is a smooth, commercial-oriented, hip-hop-informed, contemporary R&B album with pop leanings [and] Ellis' voice is in fine form [...] the album is far from compelling. Even with all the production detail and Ellis'strong performance, it sinks from its lack of high quality songs." Muzik critic Jacqueline Springer felt that the material on the album "remains loyal to the evergreen "my man and me approach," it is relayed in tones which dip between the falsetto Prince yearned to conquer and her own delicious standard. ongs like "What Did I Do to You?" and "Wait Til Tomorrow” succeed where others fail because they have clarity and polish. When combined, these elements reveal an album which stands on the threshold of hip hop, soul and luxurious R&B."

== Commercial performance ==
Southern Gal peaked at number 116 on the US Billboard 200 and reached the top 30 of the Top R&B/Hip-Hop Albums chart, peaking at number 27. As of November 1996, the album has sold 142,000 units in the United States.

== Track listing ==
Southern Gal track listing
No.	Title	Writer(s)	Producer(s)	Length
1.	"She's a Lady"	Terry Ellis; Denzil Foster; Thomas McElroy	Foster & McElroy	4:04
2.	"It Ain't Over"	Ellis; Foster; McElroy	Foster & McElroy	5:09
3.	"Where Ever You Are"	Foster; McElroy	Foster & McElroy	4:59
4.	"I Don't Want to Wait Till Tomorrow"	Carol Riddick; Curtis "Sauce" Wilson; Jeffrey Young; Marlon McClain; Rochad Holiday	Somethin' for the People	4:01
5.	"What Did I Do to You?"	Ellis; Foster; McElroy	Foster & McElroy	4:19
6.	"Slow Dance"	Ellis; Foster; McElroy	Foster & McElroy	4:21
7.	"I Don't Mind"	McClain; Ellis; Foster; McElroy	Foster & McElroy	5:18
8.	"You Make Me High"	Foster; McElroy	Foster & McElroy	4:40
9.	"Back Down Memory Lane"	McClain; Ellis; Foster; McElroy	Foster & McElroy	4:00
10.	"It's You That I Need"	Verdell Lanier; Michael Stokes	Foster & McElroy; McClain	4:19
11.	"Sista Sista"	McClain; Ellis; Foster; McElroy	Foster & McElroy	4:43
12.	"Southern Gal Interlude"	Nate Phillips; McClain; Ellis; Foster; McElroy	Foster & McElroy	1:20
Total length:				51:11

== Charts ==
Chart performance for Southern Gal
Chart (1995)	Peak position
US Billboard 200	116
US Top R&B/Hip-Hop Albums (Billboard)	27
