= 33rd Street Records =

American independent record label

- Parent company: Tower Records
- Founded: 2001
- Founder: Russ Solomon
- Defunct: 2006
- Genre: Pop, rock, blues, gospel, electronic, hip hop
- Country of origin: U.S.
- Location: Greenbrae, California

33rd Street Records was an American independent record label based in Greenbrae, California. The label was founded by Russ Solomon, the CEO of Tower Records.

The catalog includes music by Cowboy Mouth, Dramarama, Alex De Grassi, Guy Forsyth, Peter Frampton, Sammy Hagar, Ottmar Liebert, Lee Rocker, Gregg Rolie, Pete Sears, Tuck & Patti, and Steve Walsh.
