= Terry Ellis =

American R&B singer

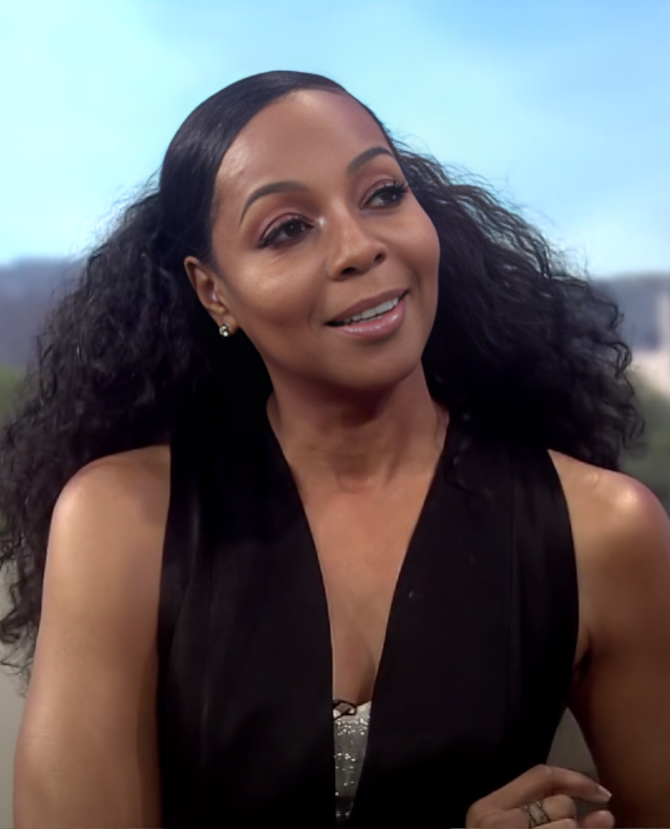
- Ellis in 2018

Background information
- Born: Terry Lynn Ellis; September 5, 1963 (age 62); Houston, Texas, U.S.
- Genres: R&B; pop; soul
- Occupations: Singer
- Years active: 1989–present
- Labels: Pyramid Records; Atlantic; eastwest
- Member of: En Vogue

Terry Lynn Ellis (born September 5, 1963) is an American singer. She is best known as a founding member of the R&B/pop vocal group En Vogue, formed in 1989.

== Biography ==
=== Early life ===
Ellis was born in Houston. Her father was a truck-driver and her mother was a housewife. She is the youngest of four daughters, and earned a Bachelor’s degree at Prairie View A&M University.

=== Career ===
In 1988 Ellis performed in a lecture/concert with singer Kashif which turned out to be an on-site audition for a proposed singing group to be created by Kashif and friends. Ellis later auditioned to sing in an upcoming female group. Initially, producers Denzil Foster and Thomas McElroy had already chosen singers Dawn Robinson, Maxine Jones, and Cindy Herron to be in a three-piece girl group, but added Ellis after hearing her sing. After joining Ellis to the lineup, the group became a quartet and originally chose the name "For You", later changed to En Vogue. Ellis sang lead vocals on the intro of the group's first single "Hold On", which peaked at number 2 on Billboard's Hot 100 chart, and sold over a million copies becoming platinum-certified by the RIAA. Later that year, the group released their debut album Born to Sing, which went platinum. Ellis also sang lead vocals on the singles "Lies" and "Don't Go", both of which charted in top-five positions on Billboard's Hot R&B/Hip-Hop Songs chart.

In 1992 En Vogue released their second studio album Funky Divas, which sold over 3.5 million copies in the United States. Ellis shares lead vocals on one of the album's top-charting singles "Free Your Mind", which won two MTV Video Music Awards, for "Best R&B Video" and "Best Dance Video". En Vogue released an EP in fall 1993, Runaway Love. In November 1995 Ellis released her debut solo album, Southern Gal while En Vogue was on hiatus. The album spawned the singles "Where Ever You Are" and "What Did I Do To You?". Within a year of its release the album had sold over 142,000 copies. The album was considered a commercial failure after sales failed to match the standard of En Vogue's success. She also released her own fragrance titled "Southern Exposure".

In 1996, En Vogue recorded "Don't Let Go (Love)" with Ellis singing the last verse of an extended version of the song. On the album's version, Ellis only sings backup on "Don't Let Go (Love)". The song was featured on the soundtrack to the motion picture Set It Off. Released in fall, it became the group's biggest hit to date going number one worldwide. It also sold over 1.8 million copies worldwide and became certified platinum by the RIAA. In response to the large commercial success of "Don't Let Go (Love)", the group steadfastly went to work on its third album. As the album was nearing completion, Robinson left the group in April 1997 after difficult contractual negotiations reached a stalemate. The ending result saw En Vogue re-recording their third album with Ellis singing lead vocals on more of the songs. In June 1997, the group released their third studio album EV3, which went platinum.

In 1999, Ellis toured as a backup singer for Toni Braxton. She also appears as one of Chanté Moore's friends in the music video "Chanté's Got a Man" in 1999. In 2000, she also released a song called "Call on Me" on the soundtrack for the HBO romantic drama Disappearing Acts. In 2005, Ellis was featured in the Stevie Wonder music video "So What The Fuss" with her original En Vogue members Dawn Robinson, Maxine Jones, and Cindy Herron. Throughout the years, Ellis continued to record on the group's albums: Masterpiece Theatre (2000), The Gift of Christmas (2002), and Soul Flower (2004). In 2012, Ellis and fellow En Vogue member Cindy Herron sued now-defunct member Maxine Jones demanding $1 million for unauthorized use of the name, though the damages request was ultimately determined to be without merit, as Ellis and Herron could not demonstrate harm done to the company from Jones's use of the name (although Robinson was named in the lawsuit, she was not directly involved in the dispute, as she had surrendered her rights to use the name herself when she departed from the LLC years earlier). However, the judge decided to award full rights of the "En Vogue" name to Herron and Ellis.

In July 2014, Ellis signed to Pyramid Records alongside En Vogue members Cindy Herron and Rhona Bennett. In November 2014, they released An En Vogue Christmas. In February 2015, Rufftown Entertainment filed a lawsuit against En Vogue, which names Herron and Ellis for breach of contract. Rufftown owner Rene Moore is seeking $310 million from the group.

=== Voice/range ===
Ellis is a soprano and has a five-octave vocal range which was displayed in the En Vogue song, "Don't Go". By her bandmates, Terry was credited as the member with the "ballad" type of voice. With En Vogue, she often shared leads, or lead the group songs that were funky, and soulful. In group harmonies, Terry usually sings the alto arrangement, which is above Maxine Jones, but under Dawn Robinson, or Cindy Herron.

== Personal life ==
During the 1990s, Ellis dated music producer Denzil Foster. Ellis is close friends with actress and model Holly Robinson Peete, whom she met on the set of the sitcom Hangin' with Mr. Cooper while recording the show's theme song, and they both share a striking physical resemblance to one another.

== Discography ==
Studio albums

- Southern Gal (1995)

== Filmography ==
Year	Title	Role	Notes
1995	Batman Forever	Girl on Corner No. 2	
