= You Don't Have to Worry (En Vogue song) =

Single by En Vogue

from the album Born to Sing
- Released: October 31, 1990
- Recorded: November – December 1989
- Studio: Starlight Sound (Lake City, Florida)
- Genre: R&B; new jack swing; hip hop
- Length: 3:47
- Label: Atlantic
- Songwriters: Thomas McElroy; Denzil Foster
- Producer: Foster & McElroy

En Vogue singles chronology
"Lies" (1990)	"You Don't Have to Worry" (1990)	"Don't Go" (1991)

Music video
- "You Don't Have to Worry" by En Vogue on YouTube

"You Don't Have to Worry" is a song by American girl group En Vogue from their debut album, Born to Sing (1990). The song was released on October 31, 1990, by Atlantic Records, as the third single from the album, and was both written and produced by Foster & McElroy. It became the group's third consecutive number-one single on the US Billboard Hot R&B/Hip-Hop Songs chart. "You Don't Have to Worry" also spent one week at number one on the Hot R&B/Hip-Hop Songs chart and peaked at number 57 on the Billboard Hot 100 Airplay. The song is led entirely by Cindy Herron, and in 1991 the group appeared and performed the song on The Oprah Winfrey Show.

"You Don't Have to Worry" contains samples of "Owner of a Lonely Heart" by Yes, "Straight Out the Jungle" by Jungle Brothers and "Get on the Good Foot" by James Brown.

== Critical reception ==
In a 2020 retrospective review, Matthew Hocter from Albumism noted the "funky groove" of the song, adding that it's a "continued demonstration of their vocal symbiosis". AllMusic editor Jose F. Promis called it "biting" in his review of Born to Sing. Upon the release, Larry Flick from Billboard magazine complimented it as a "bass-lined funk gem", remarking that "flawless harmonizing softens track's rough-hewn groove foundation, and makes this sound like another radio smash". Pan-European magazine Music & Media declared the song as "mid-tempo dance-pop, in a soulful setting, featuring a bitter-sweet melody and outstanding vocal exercises". Roger Morton from NME wrote, "The Vogue do Janet Jackson but substitute her defiance with a Supremes style quiescence." David Quantick for Smash Hits labeled it as "comparatively active".

== Track listings and formats ==
- US 12" vinyl single
1. "You Don't Have to Worry" (Club Nu Breed Mix) — 7:11
2. "You Don't Have to Worry" (Rhythmus Breedus Mix) — 3:23
3. "You Don't Have to Worry" (Lo Cal Mix) — 3:58
4. "You Don't Have to Worry" (LP Version) — 3:46
- UK 7" vinyl single
  - A. "You Don't Have to Worry" — 3:47
  - B. "Luv Lines" — 4:04
- US cassette single
  - A. "You Don't Have to Worry" (Radio Remix Edit) — 4:09
  - B. "You Don't Have to Worry" (LP Version) — 3:47
- Europe CD maxi-single
1. "You Don't Have to Worry" (7" Edit) — 3:45
2. "You Don't Have to Worry" (UK Edit) — 4:12
3. "You Don't Have to Worry" (Club Newbreed Mix) — 7:13
4. "You Don't Have to Worry" (TV Instrumental) — 3:29

== Charts ==
=== Weekly charts ===
Chart (1991)	Peak position
UK Singles (OCC)	94
US Hot R&B/Hip-Hop Songs (Billboard)	1
US Radio Songs (Billboard)	57

=== Year-end charts ===
Chart (1991)	Position
US Hot R&B/Hip-Hop Songs (Billboard)	16

== See also ==
- List of number-one R&B singles of 1991 (U.S.)
