= Cindy Herron =

American singer and actress (born 1961)

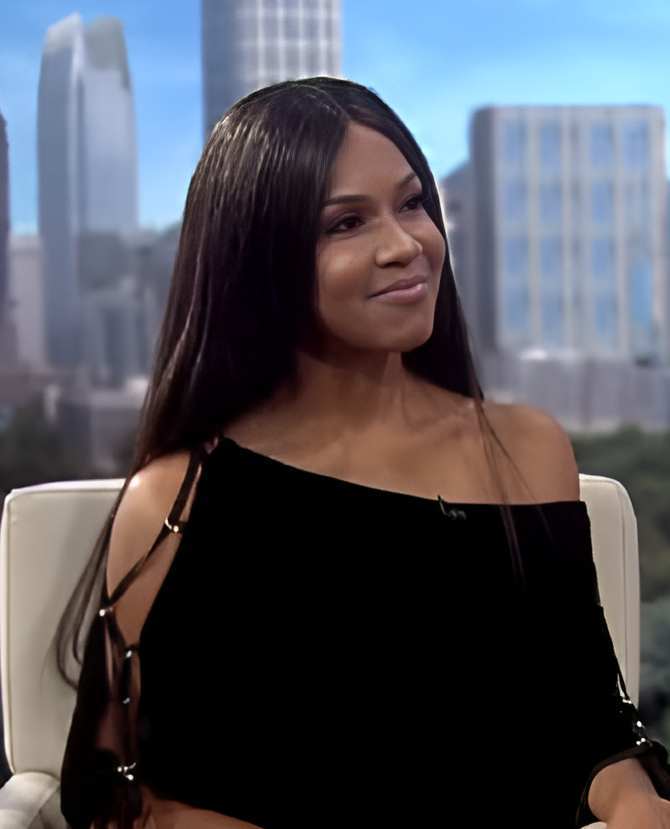
- Herron in 2018
- Born: Cynthia Ann Herron; September 26, 1961 (age 64); San Francisco, California, U.S.
- Occupations: Singer; actress; model
- Years active: 1980–present
- Spouse: Glenn Braggs (m. 1993; div. 2023)
- Children: 4
- Musical career
- Origin: Oakland, California, U.S
- Genres: R&B; soul; pop
- Instruments: Vocals, piano
- Labels: Atlantic; eastwest

Cynthia Ann Herron (born September 26, 1961), professionally known as Cindy Herron and sometimes credited as Cindy Herron–Braggs, is an American singer and actress. Herron is best known as a founding member of the R&B/pop group En Vogue, one of the world's best-selling girl groups of all time. She sang lead vocals on the group's first single "Hold On", which garnered mainstream success and sold over a million copies. Despite being absent from the group during certain periods, Herron and fellow group member Terry Ellis are the only original members to appear on all of the group's album releases to date. In the 1980s, Herron began her career as an actress, making her debut appearance in Up and Coming as "Valerie".

She later landed roles in more popular TV series including Amen and Full House. She landed a supporting role in the 1986 film release Johnnie Mae Gibson: FBI, and co-starred in Wally and the Valentines as "Roxanne Valentine". Throughout her career, Herron has sold a total of over 20 million records with En Vogue. Her work has earned her several awards and nominations, including two American Music Awards, a Billboard Music Award, seven MTV Video Music Awards, four Soul Train Music Awards and six Grammy nominations.

== Early life ==
Herron was born in San Francisco, California, to an African-American father and a Swiss-German mother. Herron attended Balboa High School, graduating in 1979. Herron began her musical career in the cabaret scene in San Francisco, during the early-1980s. Herron also worked as a background vocalist for local San Francisco Bay Area acts such as Tiggi Clay. She also appeared in the original company of the Jerry Herman musical revue Showtune (then titled Tune the Grand Up).

== Career ==
=== Pageants and acting ===
Herron was featured as a Jet Magazine's JET beauty in the January 13, 1980 issue. Herron was named "Miss San Francisco 1986" and placed 2nd-Runner Up in the 1986 Miss California Pageant. She is also a former Miss Black California. Herron has also worked as an actress, beginning in 1980 as a cast member of the PBS television drama Up and Coming. She appeared in episodes of 'Amen' & 'Full House' in the late-1980s. She later appeared in such films as Juice, En Vogue appeared on two episodes of Fox's Roc sitcom in 1993, with Herron playing the love interest of the title character's brother Joey (Rocky Carroll). Batman Forever and Lexie. In 2007, Herron played Deena Jones in the stage version of Dreamgirls.

=== En Vogue ===
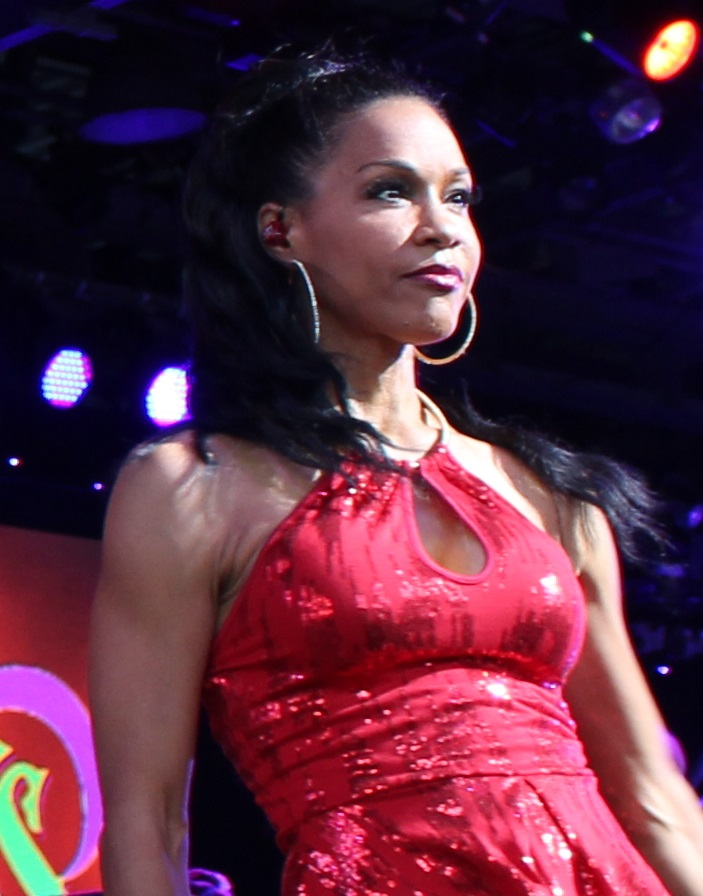
Herron in 2015

In 1988, Herron was chosen along with Dawn Robinson and Maxine Jones to be in a three-piece girl group by producers Denzil Foster and Thomas McElroy. After adding Terry Ellis to the line-up, the group became a quartet and chose the name En Vogue. Herron sang lead vocals on the group's first single "Hold On", which peaked at number 2 on Billboard's Hot 100 chart, and sold over a million copies becoming platinum certified by the RIAA. Later that year, the group released their debut album Born to Sing, which went platinum. Herron also sang lead vocals on the singles "Lies" and "You Don't Have to Worry", both of which peaked at number 1 on Billboard's Hot R&B/Hip-Hop Songs chart.

The group released their second album Funky Divas in 1992, which sold over 3.5 million copies in the United States. Herron shares lead vocals on one of the album's top-charting singles "Free Your Mind". "Free Your Mind" won two MTV Video Music Awards, for "Best R&B Video" and "Best Dance Video". En Vogue released an EP in the fall of 1993, entitled Runaway Love. In 1994, Herron went on maternity leave and temporarily left the group. Due to her brief absence from En Vogue, Herron did not record on the single "Freedom (Theme from Panther)" without the rest of the members in the music video.

In 1996, En Vogue recorded "Don't Let Go (Love)" with Herron singing the outro of the song. The song was featured on the soundtrack to the motion picture Set It Off. Released in the autumn, it became the group's biggest hit to date going number one worldwide. It also sold over 1.8 million copies worldwide and became certified platinum by the RIAA. In response to the large commercial success of "Don't Let Go (Love)", the group steadfastly went to work on its third album. As the album was nearing completion, Robinson chose to leave the group in April 1997 after difficult contractual negotiations reached a stalemate. The ending result saw En Vogue re-recording their third album with Herron singing lead vocals on more of the songs. In June 1997, the group released their third studio album EV3, which went platinum. Throughout the years, Herron continued to record on the group's album: "Masterpiece Theatre" (2000), "The Gift of Christmas" (2002), and "Soul Flower" (2004). Following the release of Soul Flower, Herron chose not to tour with En Vogue during the latter part of 2004 due to being on maternity leave again, but returned to the group the following year.

In 2012, Herron and fellow member Terry Ellis sued now-former member Maxine Jones demanding $1 million for unauthorized use of the name, though the damages request was ultimately determined to be without merit, as Herron and Ellis could not demonstrate harm done to the company from Jones's use of the name (although Robinson was named in the suit, she was not directly involved in the dispute, as she had surrendered her rights to use the name herself when she departed from the LLC years earlier). However, the judge decided to award full rights of the "En Vogue" name to Herron and Ellis.

In July 2014, Herron signed to Pyramid Records along with fellow member Ellis and Rhona Bennett. In November 2014, they released An En Vogue Christmas. In February 2015, Rufftown Entertainment filed a lawsuit against En Vogue, which names Herron and Ellis for breach of contract. Rufftown owner Rene Moore is seeking $310 million from the group.

== Personal life ==
Herron married former MLB player Glenn Braggs in June 1993. Together, they have four children; Donovan Andrew Braggs (born March 17, 1994), Jordan Braggs (born April 22, 1998), Natalia Braggs (born 1999) and Solomon Braggs (born 2004). In early 2022, Herron filed for divorce after almost 29 years of marriage with Braggs, citing “irreconcilable differences” as the reason for the breakup. She was declared legally single by January 2023.

== Filmography ==
=== Film ===
| Year | Title | Role | Notes |
|---|---|---|---|
| 1982 | High Five | Stacey | TV movie |
| 1986 | Johnnie Mae Gibson: FBI | Gloria Powell | TV movie |
| 1989 | Wally and the Valentines | Roxanne Valentine | TV movie |
| 1992 | Juice | Yolanda | |
| 1995 | Tank Girl | Model | Cameo appearance |
| 1995 | Batman Forever | Girl on the corner #3 | Cameo appearance |
| 2001 | Deadly Rhapsody | Cindy | |
| 2004 | If Love Hadn't Left Me Lonely | Lexie | Main role |
| 2012 | A Fool and His Money | Herself | Supporting role |
| 2014 | The Next Dance | Mrs. Hamilton | Supporting role |
| 2014 | An En Vogue Christmas | Herself | Main role |

=== Television ===
| Year | Title | Role | Episode |
|---|---|---|---|
| 1980 | Up and Coming | Valerie | Episode: "Pilot" |
| 1984 | ABC Afterschool Special | Betty | Episode: "The Hero Who Couldn't Read" |
| 1984 | Partners in Crime | Fan #1 | Episode: "Celebrity" |
| 1988 | Amen | Mary Lee Stehle | Episode: "Thelma's Handyman" |
| 1989 | Full House | Cindy Daniels | Episode: "Joey & Stacy and... Oh, Yeah, Jesse" |
| 1992 | The Royal Family | Torrid Terri | Episode: "The Fame Game" |
| 1993 | Sesame Street | Herself | Episode: "Telly Pretends to be Triangle Man" |
| 1993 | In Living Color | Herself | Episode: "Stacy Koon's Police Academy" |
| 1993 | A Different World | Hope | Episode: "Mind Your Own Business" |
| 1993 | Roc | The Downtown Divas | Recurring cast: Season 2 |
| 1994 | Sesame Street | Herself | Episode: "Sesame Street's 25th Birthday: A Musical Celebration" |
| 1994 | On Our Own | Shannon | Recurring cast |
| 1995 | Sesame Street | Herself | Episode: "Elmopalooza" |
| 1997 | The Wayans Bros. | Herself | Episode: "I Was En Vogue's Love Slave" |
| 1999 | Malcolm & Eddie | Olivia Simmons | Episode: "B.S. I Love You" |
| 2000 | Happily Ever After: Fairy Tales for Every Child | Doll | Episode: "The Steadfast Tin Soldier" |
| 2013 | Basketball Wife | E. Cheryl Copeland | Episode 8 |

=== Theatre ===
| Year | Title | Role | Notes |
|---|---|---|---|
| 2007 | Dreamgirls | Deena Jones | Main role |
