= Born to Sing (En Vogue album) =

Studio album by En Vogue
- Released: April 3, 1990
- Recorded: August–December 1989
- Studios: Can-Am Studio (Tarzana, California); Live Oak Studio (Berkeley, California); Starlight Sound (Richmond, California)
- Genre: R&B
- Length: 50:59
- Label: Atlantic
- Producers: Denzil Foster; Thomas McElroy

En Vogue chronology
Born to Sing (1990)	Remix to Sing (1991)

Singles from Born to Sing
- 1. "Hold On" Released: February 23, 1990; 2. "Lies" Released: June 27, 1990; 3. "You Don't Have to Worry" Released: October 31, 1990; 4. "Don't Go" Released: March 21, 1991

Born to Sing is the debut studio album by American vocal group En Vogue. It was released by Atlantic Records on April 3, 1990, in the United States. Conceived after their contribution to band founders Denzil Foster and Thomas McElroy's 1988 compilation project FM2 for Atlantic, it was chiefly produced by Foster and McElroy, with additional contribution from Hughie Prince, Don Raye, and former the Independents members Marvin Yancy and Chuck Jackson, through song covers. Musically, Born to Sing contains a range of contemporary genres, blending a mix of soft hip hop soul, pop, contemporary early-1990s R&B, rap, and new jack swing.

Upon release, the album received generally positive reviews from music critics, who complimented the band's vocal performances and their commercial appeal as well as Foster and McElroy's modern production. It became a commercial success as well. While initial sales were slow, the album reached the top thirty of the US Billboard 200 and was certified platinum by the Recording Industry Association of America (RIAA), selling over one million copies in the United States. Born to Sing experienced similar success in the United Kingdom and Canada, where it was certified silver and gold respectively.

The album produced four major single releases, including "Lies", "You Don't Have to Worry", and their debut song "Hold On", all of which peaked to number-one on Billboard's Hot R&B/Hip-Hop Songs chart. At the 33rd Annual Grammy Awards, the full album earned a nomination in the Best R&B Performance by a Duo or Group with Vocals category. Born to Sing also garnered a Best R&B/Soul Album – Group, Band or Duo at the 1991 Soul Train Music Awards, while "Hold On" received the award in the Best R&B/Soul Album – Group, Band or Duo category, and won the Billboard Music Award for Top R&B Single.

== Background ==
In the late-1980s, Oakland-based production and songwriting duo Denzil Foster and Thomas McElroy were looking for singers to sing on their 1988 compilation project FM2 for Atlantic Records. During the audition process, they conceived the idea of a modern-day girl trio in the tradition of the Supremes, Martha and the Vandellas, the Ronettes and other commercially successful female bands which had flourished in the late 1950s and early 1960s. Foster and McElroy envisioned an entertainment unit with interchangeable but not identical parts in which every member would qualify to take the lead on any given number. Thus, their plan was to recruit singers who possessed strong voices, noticeably good looks, and intelligence. Approximately 3000 women attended the auditions held in 1988, with Dawn Robinson, Cindy Herron, and Maxine Jones making the final cut. Originally conceived as a trio, Foster and McElroy decided to refashion their group as a quartet after Terry Ellis auditioned late due to a delayed flight from Houston, Texas. At first, they named the group "4-U" but soon shifted to the more mature-sounding "Vogue"; upon learning that another group already used the name, they changed it again to "En Vogue".

== Critical reception ==
Professional ratings
Review scores
Source	Rating
AllMusic	4.5/5 stars
Chicago Tribune	2.5/4 stars
Christgau's Consumer Guide	(neither)
Los Angeles Times	3/4 stars
The Rolling Stone Album Guide	3/5 stars

Born to Sing received generally positive reviews from music critics. In his review for AllMusic, Jose F. Promis called the work "a winner" though remarking that he felt tracks such as "Just Can't Stay Away" and "Part of Me" were duds. Los Angeles Times writer Dennis Hunt found that "unlike most female groups, these four R&B singers can really sing– and do some passable rapping too [...] En Vogue admirably performs a batch of mostly well-crafted ballads and medium-tempo songs. Grating, dissonant vocal blends do spoil a few otherwise strong songs." BBC Music's Daryl Easlea called Born to Sing "immediate and infectious. The group's vocal blend and succulent choice of songs was designed for maximum commerciality, a silky antidote to the gangsta rap that was then so prevalent in the US."

Spin magazine writer Kevin Westenberg felt that "those girls are some of the bad-dest things around; they are phenomenal in harmonizing. That's the kind of stuff you don't even hear anymore. You used to hear it in the Moonglows or the Five Keys. As a matter of fact, I can't think of a girl group of that era that could sing that perfect." Jan DeKnock, writing for the Chicago Tribune, found that "throughout the ups and downs of this promising but ultimately frustrating album, it's evident that each voice in the new four-woman group was clearly born to sing. And at times, [...] En Vogue's tasty harmonies are supported by an equally intoxicating groove. But then there are such wasted offerings as "Hip Hop Bugle Boy," a silly 54-second "updating" of the `40s classic "Boogie Woogie Bugle Boy"; and "Party," a one-minute rap that goes nowhere." The Rolling Stone Album Guide wrote that, "what carried Born to Sing wasn't the vocalizing so much as Foster and McElroy's slick New Jack grooves."

== Chart performance ==
In the United States, the album peaked at twenty-one on the Billboard 200 and reached the third spot on Billboard's R&B Albums chart. It was certified gold by the Recording Industry Association of America (RIAA) in June 1990 and platinum by October that same year. Born to Sing was ranked 53rd on the Billboard 200 year-end chart, and also ranked eleventh on the R&B Albums year-end chart. Within its first two years of release, it sold 1.7 million copies in the United States, according to Nielsen SoundScan. In Canada, the album peaked at number 30 on the Canadian RPM Singles Chart during the week of September 1, 1990. On March 28, 1991, Born to Sing was certified gold by the Canadian Recording Industry Association (CRIA), denoting shipments of over 50,000 copies.

== Track listing ==
All songs written and produced by Denzil Foster & Thomas McElroy, except where noted.

No.	Title	Writer(s)	Producer(s)	Length
1.	"Party"			1:10
2.	"Strange"	Foster; McElroy; En Vogue		4:39
3.	"Lies" (featuring Debbie T.)	Foster; McElroy; En Vogue; Khayree		4:16
4.	"Boogie Woogie Bugle Boy"	Don Raye; Hughie Prince	Hughie Prince; Don Raye	0:54
5.	"Hold On"			5:03
6.	"Part of Me"	Foster; McElroy; En Vogue	En Vogue; Foster; McElroy	5:58
7.	"You Don't Have to Worry"			3:47
8.	"Time Goes On"	Foster; McElroy; En Vogue		5:05
9.	"Just Can't Stay Away"	Chuck Jackson; Marvin Yancy	Chuck Jackson; Marvin Yancy	5:10
10.	"Don't Go"			5:45
11.	"Luv Lines"	Foster; McElroy; En Vogue		4:04
12.	"Waitin' on You"			5:08

30th Anniversary Expanded Edition
No.	Title	Writer(s)	Length
13.	"Hold On" (Extended Version)	Foster; McElroy; En Vogue	5:15
14.	"Lies" (The Extended Avant Garde Remix)	Foster; McElroy; En Vogue; Khayree	5:55
15.	"You Don't Have to Worry" (Club New Breed Remix)		7:13
16.	"Don't Go" (Radio Edit)		3:54
17.	"Desperately" (Foster & McElroy featuring En Vogue)		4:45
18.	"You Don't Have to Worry" (Lo Cal Mix)		4:00
19.	"Lies" (Kwame's Bone Age Remix)	Foster; McElroy; En Vogue; Khayree	4:39
20.	"Hold On" (Dub Version)	Foster; McElroy; En Vogue	3:56
21.	"Mover"		3:45

== Personnel ==
Credits are taken from the album's liner notes.

En Vogue

- Terry Ellis – vocals, dialogues
- Cindy Herron – vocals, dialogues
- Maxine Jones – vocals, dialogues
- Dawn Robinson – vocals, dialogues

Musicians

- Denzil Foster – keyboards, drum machine programming, dialogues
- Thomas McElroy – keyboards, drum machine programming, dialogues
- Grover Washington Jr. – saxophones
- Debbie T. – rap (3)

Production

- David Lombard – executive producer
- Denzil Foster – executive producer, producer, arrangements
- Thomas McElroy – producer, arrangements
- Steve Counter – recording
- Dale Everingham – recording
- Ken Kessie – recording, engineer
- Jeff Poe – additional engineer
- Sharon Cleer – assistant engineer
- Ray Floyd – assistant engineer
- Bob Fudjinski – assistant engineer
- John Jackson – assistant engineer
- Lynn Levy – assistant engineer
- James Williamson – assistant engineer
- Brian Gardner – mastering at Bernie Grundman Mastering (Hollywood, California)
- Erik Wolf – mastering assistant
- Karen Moore – A&R coordinator
- Bob Defrin – art direction
- David Roth – photography

== Charts ==
=== Weekly charts ===
Weekly chart performance for Born to Sing
Chart (1990)	Peak position
Australian Albums (ARIA)	146
Canada Top Albums/CDs (RPM)	30
Dutch Albums (Album Top 100)	58
European Albums (Music & Media)	83
New Zealand Albums (RMNZ)	37
UK Albums (Official Charts)	23
US Billboard 200	21
US Top R&B/Hip-Hop Albums (Billboard)	3

=== Year-end charts ===
Year-end chart performance for Born to Sing
Chart (1990)	Position
US Billboard 200	53
US Top R&B/Hip-Hop Albums (Billboard)	11

== Certifications ==
Certifications for Born to Sing
Region	Certification	Certified units/sales
Canada (Music Canada)	Gold	50,000^{^}
United Kingdom (BPI)	Silver	60,000^{^}
United States (RIAA)	Platinum	1,000,000^{^}
^{^} Shipments figures based on certification alone.
