= EV3 =

Studio album by En Vogue
- Released: June 17, 1997
- Recorded: September 1996 – May 1997
- Genre: R&B
- Length: 54:41
- Labels: East West; Elektra
- Producers: Babyface; David Foster; Denzil Foster; Thomas McElroy; Giuliano Franco; Andrea Martin; Ivan Matias; Organized Noize; Pro-Jay

En Vogue chronology
Runaway Love (1993)	EV3 (1997)	Masterpiece Theatre (2000)

Singles from EV3
- 1. "Don't Let Go (Love)" Released: October 22, 1996; 2. "Whatever" Released: May 13, 1997; 3. "Too Gone, Too Long" Released: September 23, 1997

EV3 is the third studio album by American female vocal group En Vogue. It was released by East West Records on June 17, 1997, in the United States. Recorded after a lengthy break during which the group members became mothers or put out solo records, the album was En Vogue's first project to include a diverse roster of collaborators including credits from Babyface, David Foster, Diane Warren, Andrea Martin, Ivan Matias, and Organized Noize along with regular contributors Foster & McElroy. It was their last album to feature Dawn Robinson, who left the group late into the recording of EV3 to focus on her solo career. Her absence meant much of the album had to be rerecorded to account for En Vogue's altered sound.

Upon its release, EV3 received mixed reviews from critics, many of whom praised the group’s vocal performances but criticized the overall production of the album. In the US, the album debuted at number eight on both Billboard's Top R&B/Hip-Hop Albums chart and the Billboard 200 with sales of 76,500 units, the band's highest first-week numbers. Internationally, EV3 entered the top forty on most charts it appeared on and remains En Vogue's highest-charting effort to date. Certified Platinum by the RIAA and Silver the BPI, the album produced three pop and R&B hit singles, including "Don't Let Go (Love)", "Whatever" and "Too Gone, Too Long".

== Background ==
In 1992, En Vogue released their second studio album Funky Divas (1992). A major success, it sold 3.5 million copies worldwide and generated three top ten singles. Following extensive touring in support of the album, the quartet started what would become a longer hiatus. While band members Cindy Herron and Maxine Jones went on maternity leave, Terry Ellis reteamed with regular En Vogue contributors Foster & McElroy to work on her solo album Southern Gal which was released to lackluster success in November 1995. In the meantime, En Vogue lent their vocals to the collaborative single "Freedom (Theme from Panther)" (1995) and recorded "Don't Let Go (Love)" for the soundtrack to the motion picture Set It Off (1996). Released in the autumn, it became the group's biggest hit yet, selling over 1.8 million copies worldwide and becoming certified platinum by the RIAA.

In response to the large commercial success of "Don't Let Go (Love)", the group steadfastly went to work on its third studio album. Originally called Friendship, it marked En Vogue's first project that was not fully produced by McElroy and Foster, with additional production coming from Babyface, Andrea Martin, David Foster, Diane Warren, and Ivan Matias to provide the group with a new modern sound. As the album was nearing completion, Dawn Robinson chose to leave the group in April 1997 for a solo recording contract with Dr. Dre's Aftermath Records after difficult contractual negotiations reached a stalemate. Her abrupt departure from En Vogue forced the remaining trio to re-record several of her original lead vocals; however, not every track was re-recorded, with Robinson's leads remaining intact on several tracks and her background vocals still appearing on every song with the exception of "Does Anybody Hear Me". The track "Let It Flow" reuses the main riff of the 1977 hit single "Slide" by funk band Slave.

== Critical reception ==
Professional ratings
Review scores
Source	Rating
AllMusic	2.5/5 stars
Chicago Tribune	2.5/4 stars
Christgau's Consumer Guide	B−
Entertainment Weekly	C+
Los Angeles Times	3/4 stars
Music Week	4/5 stars
NME	5/10
Rolling Stone	3/5 stars
Spin	7/10
The State	3.5/4 stars

Ann Powers, writing for Spin, felt that the album "follows the groove laid down by the group's creators, Denzil Foster and Thomas McElroy, expressing female prowess in terms of lovesexy seductiveness, socially conscious righteousness, and ail-that independent attitude." Complimenting En Vogue's "flawless form"; she concluded that "like an acrobatic Jordan jam with a minute left in the fourth quarter, EV3 elicits a familiar, gleeful wonder at humanity's potential." In her review for Newsweek, Allison Samuels wrote that EV3 "has all the right ingredients". Los Angeles Times writer Connie Johnson felt Dawn Robinson's presence on her final work with the group was "an integral part of the womanly, more mature stance of this album." She ranked Diane Warren–penned "Too Gone, Too Long" among the album's highlights, calling it a "performance upon which musical reps are truly built".

Opposed to this, Stephen Leo Stanley from AllMusic found that Robinson's departure left the album unaffected since "the group's harmonies remain remarkably supple and soulful". While he considered EV3 full of "enough strong moments", he was critical of the band's decision to work with Warren and regular producer David Foster and their adult contemporary sound on "Too Gone, Too Long". Chicago Tribune editor Monica Eng commented that EV3 found the band dabbling "in an array of genres, trying to find their new voice", with uneven results. Entertainment Weekly's J.D. Considine noted that EV3 underlined the group's status as "producer's pets", citing that on EV3 "no surprise, then, that although the women get top billing, the arrangements are the real stars." In his Consumer Guide, Robert Christgau gave the album a "B−" rating.

== Commercial performance ==
In the United States, EV3 debuted at number eight on both the US Billboard Top R&B/Hip-Hop Albums chart and the Billboard 200 in the issue dated July 5, 1997. Selling approximately 76,500 copies in its first week of release, the album marked the band's highest debut on both charts as well as their biggest first week sales yet. On August 26, 1997, EV3 was awarded platinum by the Recording Industry Association of America (RIAA), indicating sales in excess of 1.0 million copies. Elsewhere, the album entered the top forty on most charts it appeared on. EV3 reached top ten in Germany, Switzerland, and the United Kingdom becoming the band's second top ten album after Funky Divas.

EV3 spawned three hit singles. Lead single, "Don't Let Go (Love)", was a worldwide hit and peaked at number 2 on the Billboard Hot 100 and number 1 on Billboard's Hot R&B/Hip-Hop Songs chart. The single sold 1.3 million copies in the United States and was certified platinum by the RIAA. The second single, "Whatever" peaked at number 16 on the Billboard Hot 100 and number 8 on Billboard's Hot R&B/Hip-Hop Songs chart. The single was certified gold by the RIAA after sales of over 500,000 copies. "Too Gone, Too Long", the album's final single released, was a top 40 hit on both the Billboard Hot 100 at number 33 and Hot R&B/Hip-Hop Songs at number 25.

== Track listing ==
EV3 track listing
No.	Title	Writer(s)	Producer(s)	Length
1.	"Whatever"	Kenneth Edmonds; Keith Andes; Giuliano Franco	Babyface; Franco^{[A]}	4:20
2.	"Don't Let Go (Love)"	Andrea Martin; Ivan Matias; Organized Noize; Marqueze Ethridge	Organized Noize; Matias^{[b]}	4:52
3.	"Right Direction"	Chris Bolden; J.B. Eckl	Martin; Matias	5:07
4.	"Damn, I Wanna Be Your Lover"	Martin; Matias; Pro-Jay	Martin; Matias; Pro-Jay	5:24
5.	"Too Gone, Too Long"	Diane Warren	David Foster	4:42
6.	"You're All I Need"	Matias	Matias	3:36
7.	"Let It Flow"	Denzil Foster; Thomas McElroy	Foster & McElroy	5:38
8.	"Sitting by Heaven's Door"	Foster; McElroy	Foster & McElroy	4:34
9.	"Love Makes You Do Thangs"	Foster; McElroy	Foster & McElroy	4:27
10.	"What a Difference a Day Makes"	Foster; McElroy	Foster & McElroy	4:12
11.	"Eyes of a Child"	Foster; McElroy	Foster & McElroy	4:32
12.	"Does Anybody Hear Me"	Terry Ellis; Cindy Herron; Maxine Jones; Matias	Martin; Matias	3:09
Total length:				54:41

International edition
No.	Title	Writer(s)	Producer(s)	Length
13.	"I've Got Your Gun"	Foster; McElroy	Foster & McElroy	4:19

Japanese And 2026 Record Store Day edition
No.	Title	Writer(s)	Producer(s)	Length
14.	"It's About Love"	T. Ellis; C. Herron; M. Jones; D. Robinson; I. Matias; James Gass; Brion James	Martin; Matias	5:12
15.	"Keep Your Money"	Matias; Griffin	Matias	4:18

Notes

- ^{^[A]} denotes co-producer
- ^{^[B]} denotes vocal producer

== Credits and personnel ==
- Terry Ellis, Cindy Herron, Maxine Jones, Dawn Robinson – lead vocals, backing vocals
- Denzil Foster, Thomas McElroy – music arranger, backing vocals
- James Earley – electric guitar, bass
- Thomas McElroy, Denzil Foster – keyboard, drum machine
- Norbet Stachel – saxophone
- Garry Barnes – bass
- Bernard Grobeman – guitar
- Marlon McClain – electric guitar, acoustic guitar
- Chanz – grand piano
- Babyface – synthesizer, electric piano, drum programming
- Kevin Wyatt, Nate Phillips – bass guitar
- Giuliano Franco – synthesizer, drum programming
- Lil John – drums
- Preston Crump – bass
- Martin Terry, Tommy Martin – guitar
- Mark Coleman – electric guitar
- Bill Ortiz – trumpet
- Ken Kessie – mixing
- Steve Counter – engineering
- Organized Noize – production
- Jason Eckl – guitar
- Neal H. Pogue – mixing
- Dennis Bolden – organ, programming
- Andrea Martin – production
- James Gass – programming
- JAH – rap vocals
- Chris Bolden, Ivan Matias – production
- Rudy Haeusermann – engineering
- David Foster – keyboards, production
- Dean Parks – acoustic guitar
- Blake Eisenman – engineering
- Michael Thompson – electric guitar
- Felipe Elgueta – engineering
- Adrion Sinclair – programming
- Pro-Jay – programming, production
- Cindy Herron, Terry Ellis, Dawn Robinson, Maxine Jones – vocal arrangement
- Denzil Foster, Thomas McElroy – production, arrangement and composition
- Sylvia Rhone – executive production
- En Vogue – executive production

== Charts ==
=== Weekly charts ===
Weekly chart performance for EV3
Chart (1997)	Peak position
Australian Albums (ARIA)	20
Austrian Albums (Ö3 Austria)	21
Belgian Albums (Ultratop Flanders)	13
Canada Top Albums/CDs (RPM)	28
Dutch Albums (Album Top 100)	14
European Top 100 Albums (Music & Media)	9
Finnish Albums (Suomen virallinen lista)	31
French Albums (SNEP)	47
German Albums (Offizielle Top 100)	9
Japanese Albums (Oricon)	34
New Zealand Albums (RMNZ)	29
Norwegian Albums (VG-lista)	40
Scottish Albums (Official Charts)	47
Swedish Albums (Sverigetopplistan)	12
Swiss Albums (Schweizer Hitparade)	7
UK Albums (Official Charts)	9
UK R&B Albums (Official Charts)	1
US Billboard 200	8
US Top R&B/Hip-Hop Albums (Billboard)	8

=== Year-end charts ===
Year-end chart performance for EV3
Chart (1997)	Position
German Albums (Offizielle Top 100)	81
US Billboard 200	158

== Certifications ==
Certifications for EV3
Region	Certification	Certified units/sales
Japan (RIAJ)	Gold	100,000^{^}
United Kingdom (BPI)	Silver	60,000^{^}
United States (RIAA)	Platinum	1,000,000^{^}
^{^} Shipments figures based on certification alone.
