= Foster & McElroy =

American production team

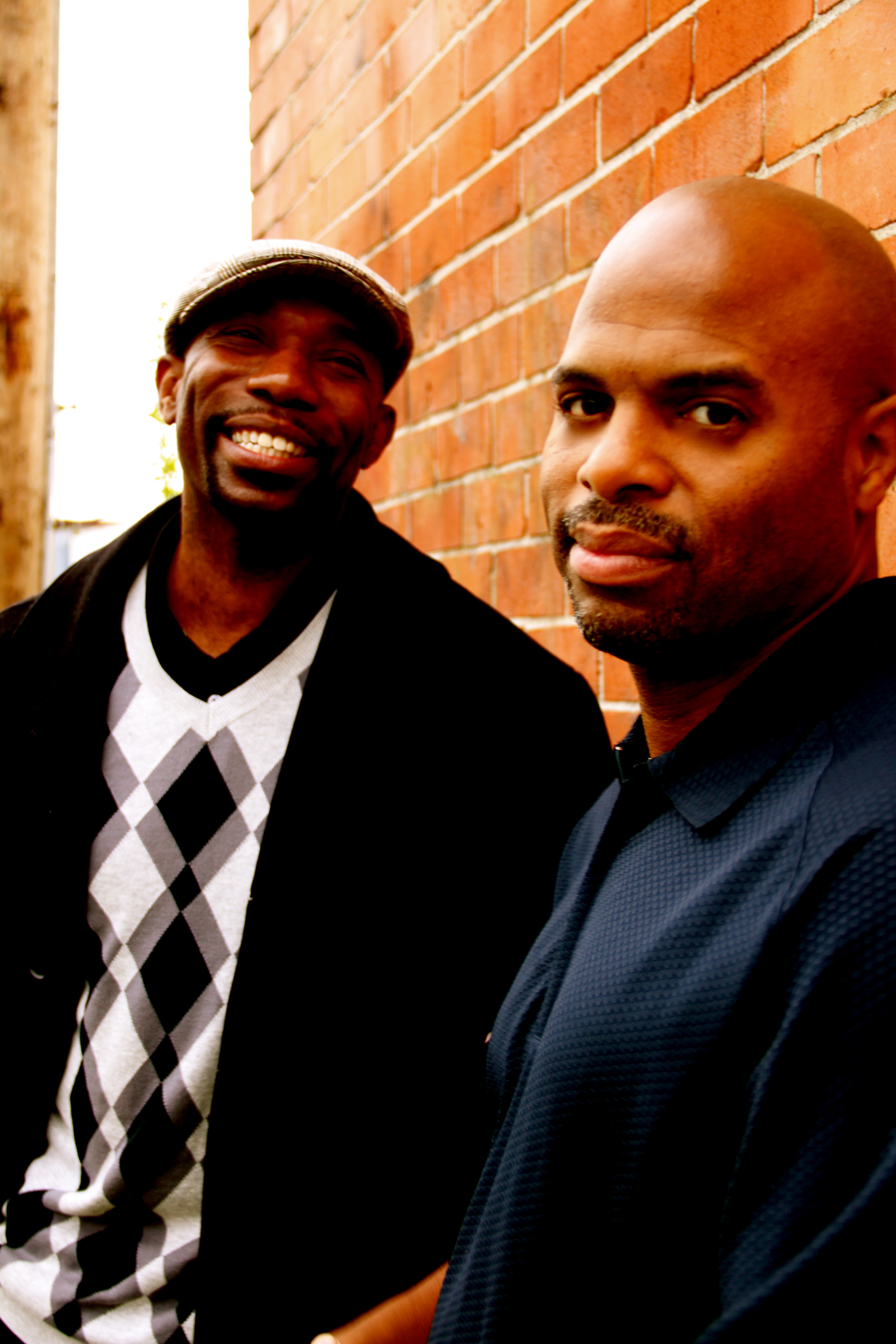
- Denzil Foster (left) and Thomas McElroy

Background information
- Also known as: Fmob
- Born: Denzil Foster & Thomas McElroy
- Origin: Oakland, California (both)
- Genres: R&B; soul; new jack swing; urban; dance; funk
- Occupations: Songwriters; producers
- Instruments: keyboards, synthesizers, drum machine
- Years active: 1986–present

Denzil Foster and Thomas McElroy are an American R&B record production and songwriting duo, releasing recordings under the names Foster & McElroy and Fmob. They have written and produced songs for musicians such as Club Nouveau, Tony! Toni! Toné!, Alexander O'Neal, Regina Belle, and Swing Out Sister. Their music has been sampled in hit songs by the Luniz, Puff Daddy, Ashanti, Jay-Z, Jennifer Lopez, LL Cool J, Jessica Simpson, and others. Foster & McElroy are best known as the founders of the group En Vogue, listed by Billboard as one of the "Top 10 Girl Groups of All Time". In addition to producing music for various television shows, they are also credited for songs in numerous movie soundtracks including The Great White Hype, Lean on Me, and Who's That Girl.

== Biography ==
Denzil Foster was born in Oakland, CA and was greatly influenced by different styles of music, from The Beatles to Parliament/Funkadelic. Thomas McElroy, also born in Oakland, was influenced by his father's love for jazz music. The two musicians first met in California while attending college and decided to work together as colleagues.

== Career ==
Signing to the independent Triangle label, they released one 12" single. Soon after, Foster & McElroy joined forces with Jay King producing Timex Social Club's hit single "Rumors" in 1986. When that group disbanded, they regrouped with King to form Club Nouveau. Eventually, the duo left Club Nouveau after their first album Life, Love & Pain to focus on production and songwriting. In 1988, they landed a production deal with Wing Records, eventually signing the band Tony! Toni! Toné!, as well as brother and sister act Channel 2.

Foster & McElroy are considered pioneers of new jack swing, a genre they helped define with the group Tony! Toni! Tone!. The duo produced the group's first album and had success with the first single release, "Little Walter", which peaked at number 47 on the Billboard Hot 100. In 1990, the group released The Revival, its second album which went 2× Platinum and had numerous number-one singles. Following the success of Tony! Toni! Toné!, Foster & McElroy released their first album as a group, FM2, one of which included songs such as "Around the World in 80 Beats", "Gotta Be a Better Way", and "Dr. Soul", the latter of which was a top ten R&B hit featuring rapper MC Lyte. It earned moderate success. While working on the album, Foster & McElroy made plans to put together a girl group that would be a modern-day version of the Supremes, with what eventually became the group En Vogue.

After several audition calls, Foster & McElroy eventually selected Cindy Herron, Maxine Jones, and Dawn Robinson to become the members of the newly titled "For You". The group became a quartet after the addition of Terry Ellis and the name was changed to "Vogue". After learning that another group already had that moniker, Foster & McElroy changed the name to "En Vogue". The group's first album, Born to Sing, was released in 1990 and sold over one million copies with numerous singles reaching number one on Billboard charts. En Vogue's second album, Funky Divas, was released in 1992 and became the highest-selling album to date and one of the top selling albums of that year with over five million copies sold worldwide. With hits such as "Hold On", "Lies", "Free Your Mind", "My Lovin' (You're Never Gonna Get It)", and "Don't Let Go (Love)", En Vogue has become one of the most successful girl groups in music history. It was also listed as one of the Top 10 Girl Groups of All Time by Billboard.

They recorded a second album in 1994, a hip-hop jazz album Once in a Blue Moon, under their new name FMob. The duo has also written theme songs for television programs, including Hangin' with Mr. Cooper, Roc (both themes, used during the former’s first season and the latter’s final two seasons, were performed by En Vogue), and BET's Video Soul. They have also been credited with numerous movie soundtracks.

== Discography ==
=== Singles ===
Year	Title	Artist	Credits	Notes
2008	Blue Magic	Jay Z	Writers	Peaked at #17 on Billboard Hot Rap Songs
2000	Riddle	En Vogue	Writers & Producers	From the album Masterpiece Theatre
1999	Satisfy You	Puff Daddy	Writers	Peaked at #1 on Billboard Hot Rap Songs and Hot R&B/Hip-Hop Songs
1995	I Got 5 On It	The Luniz	Writers	Peaked at #4 on Billboard Hot R&B/Hip-Hop Songs
1993	Give It Up, Turn It Loose	En Vogue	Writers & Producers	Peaked at #10 on Mainstream Top 40 and #15 on Billboard Hot 100
1993	Free Your Mind	En Vogue	Writers & Producers	Peaked at #8 on Billboard Hot 100 and nominated for Grammy.
1992	Something He Can Feel	En Vogue	Writers & Producers	Peaked at #1 on Billboard Hot R&B/Hip-Hop Songs
1992	My Lovin' (You're Never Gonna Get It)	En Vogue	Writers & Producers	Certified Gold by the RIAA and peaked at #1 on Billboard Hot R&B Singles
1991	Don't Go	En Vogue	Writers & Producers	#2 Billboard Hot R&B/Hip-Hop Songs
1991	Midnight Run	Alexander O'Neal	Writers & Producers	#3 Billboard Hot R&B/Hip-Hop Songs, #49 Pop
1990	You Don't Have To Worry	En Vogue	Writers & Producers	#1 Billboard Hot R&B/Hip-Hop Songs
1990	So You Like What You See	Samuelle	Writers & Producers	#1 Billboard Hot R&B/Hip-Hop Songs
1990	Lies	En Vogue	Writers & Producers	#1 Billboard Hot R&B/Hip-Hop Songs
1990	Hold On	En Vogue	Writers & Producers	Platinum, #2 Pop
1989	Dr. Soul	Foster McElroy	Writers & Producers	#10 Billboard Hot R&B/Hip-Hop Songs
1989	Body Talk	Sharon Bryant	Writers & Producers	#15 Billboard Hot R&B/Hip-Hop Songs
1989	For The Love Of You	Tony! Toni! Tone!	Writers & Producers	#3 Billboard Hot R&B/Hip-Hop Songs
1988	Baby Doll	Tony! Toni! Tone!	Writers & Producers	#2 Billboard Hot R&B/Hip-Hop Songs
1988	"Born Not to Know"	Tony! Toni! Tone!	Writers & Producers	#2 Billboard Hot R&B/Hip-Hop Songs
1988	Tell Me It's Not Too Late	LIA	Writers & Producers	#33 Billboard Hot R&B/Hip-Hop Songs
1988	True Obsession	LIA	Writers & Producers	#49 Billboard Hot R&B/Hip-Hop Songs
1988	Little Walter	Tony! Toni! Tone!	Writers & Producers	#1 Billboard Hot R&B/Hip-Hop Songs
1988	Little Drummer Boy	Alexander O'Neal	Writers & Producers	#1 Billboard Hot R&B/Hip-Hop Songs
1987	To Prove My Love	Michael Cooper	Writers & Producers	#1 Billboard Hot R&B/Hip-Hop Songs
1986	Last Time	Theresa	Writers & Producers	#12 Billboard Hot R&B/Hip-Hop Songs
1986	Heavy On My Mind	Club Nouveau	Writers & Producers	#7 Billboard Hot R&B/Hip-Hop Songs
1986	Why You Treat Me So Bad	Club Nouveau	Writers & Producers	#2 Billboard Hot R&B/Hip-Hop Songs, #21 Pop
1986	Lean On Me	Club Nouveau	Writers & Producers	#2 Billboard Hot R&B/Hip-Hop Songs, #1 Pop
1986	Situation #9	Club Nouveau	Writers & Producers	#2 Billboard Hot R&B/Hip-Hop Songs
1986	Jealousy	Club Nouveau	Writers & Producers	#1 Dance, #8 Billboard Hot R&B/Hip-Hop Songs
1986	Rumors	Timex Social Club	Producers	4× Platinum, #1 Billboard Hot R&B/Hip-Hop Songs & #6 Pop

=== Albums ===
Year	Title	Artist	Credits	Notes
2018	Electric Café	En Vogue	Writers & Producers	
2004	Soul Flower	En Vogue	Writers & Producers	#47 on the charts for Top R&B/Hip-Hop Albums and #15 on Billboard's Independent Albums chart
2002	The Gift of Christmas	En Vogue	Writers & Producers	
2000	Masterpiece Theatre	En Vogue	Writers & Producers	Peaked at #33 on Billboard R&B and #67 on Billboard 200
1997	EV3	En Vogue	Writers & Producers	Platinum
1995	Southern Gal	Terry Ellis	Writers & Producers	Peaked at #27 on Billboard R&B/Hip-hop albums
1995	Reachin' Back	Regina Belle	Writers & Producers	Peaked at #18 on Billboard R&B
1994	Once In A Blue Moon	FMob	Writers & Producers	
1993	Runaway Love	En Vogue	Writers & Producers	Peaked at #16 on Billboard Top R&B/Hip-Hop Albums
1992	Funky Divas	En Vogue	Writers & Producers	5× Platinum, #8 Pop
1999	Forever	Puff Daddy	Sample tracks used from Why You Treat Me So Bad	#2 on Billboard 200
1990	Born To Sing	En Vogue	Writers & Producers	Platinum, #1 R&B, #8 Pop
1990	Revival	Tony! Toni! Tone!	Writers & Producers	2× Platinum, #1 R&B
1990	Living in Black Paradise	Samuelle	Writers & Producers	#37 R&B
1989	FM2	Foster & McElroy	Writers, Producers, Performers	
1988	Let It Be Me	Robert Brookins	Writers & Producers	#37 R&BTop R&B/Hip-Hop Albums
1988	Who?	Tony! Toni! Tone!	Writers & Producers	Gold, #1 R&B
1986	Life, Love & Pain	Club Nouveau	Writers & Producers	3× Platinum, #1 R&B, #2 Pop

=== Movie soundtracks ===
Year	Soundtrack	Song(s)	Credits
1996	The Great White Hype	We Got It	Writers & Producers
1989	Lean on Me	Lean on Me	Writers & Producers
1987	Who's That Girl	Step by Step	Writers & Producers
