= Hold On (En Vogue song) =

1990 single by En Vogue

Single by En Vogue

from the album Born to Sing
- B-side: "Lies"
- Released: February 23, 1990
- Recorded: August – September 1989
- Studio: Starlight Sound (Lake City, Florida)
- Genre: R&B; new jack swing
- Length: 5:03; 4:23 (7-inch edit)
- Label: Atlantic
- Songwriters: Thomas McElroy; Denzil Foster; Terry Ellis; Cindy Herron; Maxine Jones; Dawn Robinson
- Producers: Denzil Foster; Thomas McElroy

En Vogue singles chronology
"Hold On" (1990)	"Lies" (1990)

Music video
- "Hold On" on YouTube

"Hold On" is a song by American girl group En Vogue, released in February 1990 by Atlantic Records as the first single from their debut album, Born to Sing (1990). It was produced by Denzil Foster and Thomas McElroy, and written by the former two and all members of the group. It peaked at number two on the US Billboard Hot 100 and topped the Billboard Dance Club Play, 12-inch Singles Sales, and Hot Black Singles charts. Internationally, "Hold On" entered the top 10 in the Netherlands, New Zealand, and the United Kingdom. Its accompanying music video was directed by Tarsem Singh. En Vogue performed "Hold On" at the 2008 BET Awards with Alicia Keys. In 2017, it was ranked number four on Spin magazine's ranking of "The 30 Best '90s R&B Songs".

== Production ==
The song opens with an a cappella rendition of the Motown standard "Who's Lovin' You", written by Smokey Robinson and originally recorded by his group, the Miracles. It features lead vocals by Cindy Herron and Terry Ellis vocals on the introduction.

== Critical reception ==
David Taylor-Wilson from Bay Area Reporter complimented the song as "sexy and gentle, with a teasing, downtempo dance beat." Bill Coleman from Billboard magazine wrote, "Step back and give 'em some room! Quartet of future divas fresh from the Foster/McElroy stable deliver intricate, tight harmonies with a dash of sass on this groove-laden debut. Can't wait for the album." He also noted its "lazy and hypnotic R&B pulse [that] serves as the perfect bed for the members' on-the-money styling; you would be doing your dancefloor a great disservice if you ignored it..." Jan DeKnock from Chicago Tribune felt En Vogue's "tasty harmonies are supported by an equally intoxicating groove." A. Scott Galloway from The Network Forty wrote, "Gold single, golden girls! What more do you need to convince you to spin this hardcore dance floor jam." Gerald Martinez from New Sunday Times declared it as "gospel-funk" with "stunning vocal arrangements."

In his album review, Edward Hill from The Plain Dealer remarked that "Hold On" "is already famous for its no-holds-barred a cappella opening and sluggishly powerful bassline. On 12-inch it's pepped up with bonus beats and a slightly faster rhythm track." David Quantick from Smash Hits complimented it as "lithe and lovely". Steve Daly, writing for Spin magazine, said the song is "perfect for those warm evening on the stoop", and felt that the "exotic melody takes its cue from Soul II Soul, while the rhythm section does a slow grind in 95 percent humidity with no AC." Cheo H. Coker from Stanford Daily wrote, "It was the first song in a long time that featured real singing, perfect four-part harmony (a capella no less), and a mother lode of hip-hop attitude and feeling." A reviewer from Wells Journal called it "a moody but repetitive song with mellow backing track".

=== Retrospective reviews ===
Retrospectively, AllMusic editor Jose F. Promis described the song as a "cool, shuffling, timeless hip-hop R&B track". Another editor, Stephen Thomas Erlewine, described it as "yearning". In 2007, Laura Checkoway from Vibe declared it as "an answer of sorts" to 1962's "Who's Lovin' You" from Smokey Robinson & The Miracles.

== Commercial performance ==
Following its release, "Hold On" peaked at number one on the US Billboard Hot Black Singles chart, number two on Billboard's Hot 100 on July 21, 1990, and number one on Billboard's Dance Club Play and 12-inch Singles Sales charts. "Hold On" was also a hit in several countries worldwide, reaching number five in the United Kingdom and New Zealand, number six in Germany, number 10 in the Netherlands, and number 12 in Austria. In West Asia, it became a top-20 hit in Israel, peaking at number 11 on June 10, 1990. It was the top R&B hit on the Billboard Year-End chart for 1990 and was the eighth most-successful pop hit on the Billboard Hot 100 Year-End chart.

== Music video ==
A music video was produced to promote the single, directed by Indian director Tarsem Singh. It begins with a close-up of Terry Ellis singing the lead vocal of the intro, with the three other girls singing background vocals and standing either behind her or in front of her. They are all dressed in black. When the rhythm kicks in, several male dancers appear. Cindy Herron then takes over the lead vocal, standing in the front, with the three others backing her. The background dancers were filmed performing their dance moves slowly, and the footage was then sped up in the editing to match the song's rhythm. The effect gave the dancers a surreal sped-up quality. Actor/model Djimon Hounsou appears in the video as a trumpet player.

== Impact and legacy ==
The Daily Telegraph ranked "Hold On" number 47 in their "Top 50 Dance Songs" list in 2015, adding, "R&B girl group En Vogue broke through with this club classic. A sharp acapella rendition of Motown standard 'Who's Lovin You' leads into a hip-hop beat with a funky bass line, horn and piano sounds. "You've got to hold on, to your love", the girls proclaim, and it is their powerful singing that carries this one." Spin ranked the song number four in their list of "The 30 Best '90s R&B Songs" in 2017. They wrote, "Producers Foster & McElroy deliver a slow-burning rhythm with a James Brown drum kick, but 'Hold On''s greatest element is Herron, Terry Ellis, Dawn Robinson, and Maxine Jones blending their voices into a sound that shifts the culture." In 2019, Billboard magazine ranked it number 130 in their list of "Billboard's Top Songs of the '90s".

== Awards and nominations ==
Year	Award	Category	Album / Track	Result
1990	Billboard Music Award	R&B Single of the Year	"Hold On"	Won
1991	Grammy Award	Best R&B Vocal Performance by a Duo or Group	"Hold On"	Nominated
1991	Soul Train Music Award	Best Single by a Duo/Group	"Hold On"	Won

== Track listings ==
- US 12-inch single

A1. "Hold On" (album version) – 5:18
B1. "Hold On" (instrumental) – 3:56
B2. "Hold On" (dub version) – 3:56

- US cassette single

A. "Hold On"
B. "Luv Lines"

- UK 7-inch single
1. "Hold On" (7-inch edit) – 4:23
2. "Hold On" (instrumental) – 3:56
- UK CD single
1. "Hold On" (seven inch edit) – 4:23
2. "Hold On" (extended version) – 5:16
3. "Hold On" (radio version with intro) – 5:07
- UK cassette single
1. "Hold On" (Tuff Jam's Radio Mix) – 4:04
2. "Hold On" (C-Swing's Jerk Mix Radio Edit) – 4:00

== Credits and personnel ==
Credits are adapted from the liner notes of Born to Sing.

- Terry Ellis – vocals
- Dawn Robinson – vocals
- Cindy Herron – vocals
- Maxine Jones – vocals
- Mark Fisher – keyboards
- Grover Washington, Jr. – saxophone
- David Lombard – executive producer
- Thomas McElroy – producer, music
- Denzil Foster – executive producer, producer, music

== Charts ==
=== Weekly charts ===
Chart (1990–1991)	Peak position
Australia (ARIA)	64
Canada Top Singles (RPM)	51
Canada Dance/Urban (RPM)	2
Europe (Eurochart Hot 100)	14
Finland (Suomen virallinen lista)	30
Ireland (IRMA)	18
Israel (Israeli Singles Chart)	11
Luxembourg (Radio Luxembourg)	3
Netherlands (Dutch Top 40)	12
Netherlands (Single Top 100)	10
New Zealand (Recorded Music NZ)	5
UK Singles (Official Charts)	5
UK Club Chart (Record Mirror)	1
US Billboard Hot 100	2
US Dance Club Songs (Billboard)	1
US Dance Singles Sales (Billboard)	1
US Hot R&B/Hip-Hop Songs (Billboard)	1
US Cash Box Top 100	3

Chart (1998)	Peak position
Scottish Singles Sales (Official Charts)	98
UK Singles (Official Charts)	53
UK Dance (Official Charts)	17
UK Hip Hop/R&B (Official Charts)	11

=== Year-end charts ===
Chart (1990)	Position
Canada Dance/Urban (RPM)	24
Netherlands (Single Top 100)	79
New Zealand (RIANZ)	26
UK Singles (OCC)	45
UK Club Chart (Record Mirror)	13
US Billboard Hot 100	8
US 12-inch Singles Sales (Billboard)	3
US Dance Club Play (Billboard)	14
US Hot R&B Singles (Billboard)	1
US Cash Box Top 100	10

== Certifications ==
Region	Certification	Certified units/sales
United States (RIAA)	Platinum	1,000,000^{^}
^{^} Shipments figures based on certification alone.

== Release history ==
Region	Date	Format(s)	Label(s)	Ref.
United States	February 23, 1990	7-inch vinyl; 12-inch vinyl; cassette	Atlantic	
Australia	July 23, 1990	7-inch vinyl; 12-inch vinyl; cassette	Atlantic	
Japan	July 25, 1990	Mini-CD	Atlantic	

== See also ==
- R&B number-one hits of 1990 (USA)
- List of number-one year-end R&B singles (U.S.)
- Number-one dance hits of 1990
