= Maxine Jones =

American singer

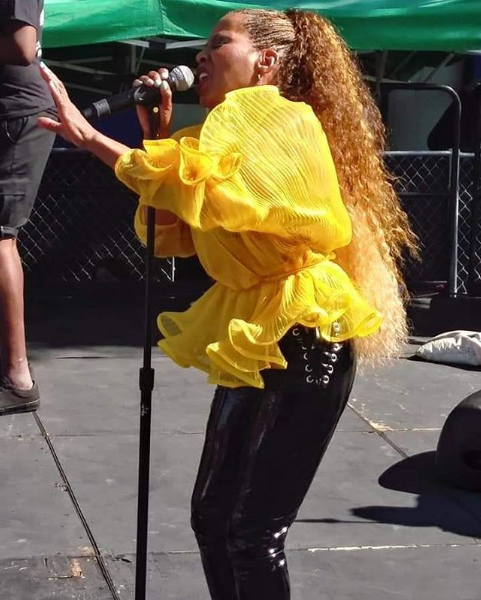
- Jones performing at Soul of Pride, 2019

Background information
- Born: January 16, 1962 (age 64) (Note: or January 16, 1966 (age 60)(sources differ)); Paterson, New Jersey, U.S.
- Origin: Oakland, California, U.S.
- Genres: R&B; soul; pop
- Occupations: Singer, songwriter, actress, businesswoman
- Years active: 1989–present
- Labels: Atlantic; East West; Elektra
- Member of: En Vogue

Maxine Jones (born January 16, 1962) is an American singer, songwriter, actress and businesswoman, best known as a founding member of the R&B-pop group En Vogue, one of the world's best-selling girl groups of all time. She sang lead vocals on the group's signature singles "My Lovin' (You're Never Gonna Get It)" and "Don't Let Go (Love)", both of which garnered international success and sold over a million copies. Throughout her career, Jones has sold over 20 million records with En Vogue. Her work has earned her several awards and nominations, including two American Music Awards, a Billboard Music Award, four MTV Video Music Awards, and four Soul Train Music Awards.

== Biography ==
=== Early life ===
Born in Paterson, New Jersey, her mother died when she was 5 years old, and Jones moved to Oakland, California with her three sisters at 15 years old. Before her career, she was a hair salon worker.

=== 1989–2011: En Vogue ===
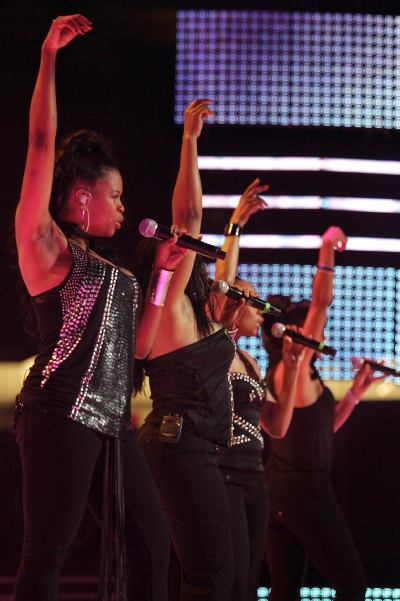
Jones (second from the left) performing with En Vogue during their reunion tour, 2009

In 1988, Jones was chosen along with Dawn Robinson and Cindy Herron to be in a three-woman girl group by producers Denzil Foster and Thomas McElroy. After adding Terry Ellis to the line-up, the group became a quartet and chose the name En Vogue. They began recording their debut album in 1989 and finished in 1990. In 1990, En Vogue released their first single "Hold On", which became a number one single on the Hot R&B/Hip-Hop Songs chart. Later that year, the group released their debut album Born to Sing, which sold a million copies the United States.

The group released their second album Funky Divas in 1992, which sold over 3.5 million copies in the United States. The album's lead single "My Lovin' (You're Never Gonna Get It)", which features Jones on lead vocals, peaked at number two on the Billboard Hot 100 and number one on the R&B chart. "Give It Up, Turn It Loose", lead completely by Jones, was released as the album's fourth single. The song peaked at number fifteen on the Billboard's Hot 100, and received a nomination for a Grammy Award for Best R&B Performance by a Duo or Group with Vocals at 36th Annual Grammy Awards. Jones also shares lead vocals on one of the album's top-charting singles "Free Your Mind". "Free Your Mind" won two MTV Video Music Awards, for "Best R&B Video" and "Best Dance Video". En Vogue released an EP in the fall of 1993, entitled Runaway Love. The lead single "Whatta Man", featuring co-lead vocals by Jones and a collaboration with Salt-N-Pepa, peaked in the top-ten on the Billboard charts and sold over a million copies. In 1995, En Vogue was featured on the single "Freedom (Theme from Panther)".

In 1996, En Vogue released "Don't Let Go (Love)" with Jones singing co-lead vocals of the song. The song was featured on the soundtrack to the motion picture Set It Off. Released in the autumn, it became the group's biggest hit to date going number one worldwide. It also sold over 1.8 million copies worldwide and became certified platinum by the RIAA. In response to the large commercial success of "Don't Let Go (Love)", the group steadfastly went to work on its third album. As the album was nearing completion, Robinson chose to leave the group in April 1997 after difficult contractual negotiations reached a stalemate. The ending result saw En Vogue re-recording their third album with Jones singing lead vocals on more of the songs. In June 1997, the group released their third studio album EV3, which went platinum. In 2000, they released their fourth album, Masterpiece Theatre. The following year, Jones left En Vogue to focus on family and was replaced by Amanda Cole. After the release of En Vogue's fifth album, Jones returned to the group. In late 2004, Jones toured with En Vogue while Cindy was on maternity leave and continued to perform with En Vogue until April 2012.

On September 26, 2011, Ellis, Jones, and Herron released a single "I'll Cry Later" from their forthcoming album that was planned for a December release. Negotiations for the album release resulted in Jones leaving En Vogue, which was discussed with Robinson on Access Hollywood nearly a year later on October 17, 2012.

=== 2012–13: Heirs to the Throne and En Vogue to the Max ===
In October 2012, Jones and Dawn Robinson appeared on Access Hollywood to announce they are forming a new girl group called Heirs to the Throne. The duo launched their website, Twitter, and Facebook for the new group. They also performed at several venues with Shaunté Usual as their third member. The following year, Robinson and Jones parted ways and Jones went on to form her own group called "En Vogue to the Max". It was later announced that the former group mates Cindy Herron and Terry Ellis sued Jones for use of the En Vogue name and demanding one million dollars for damages. However, Ellis and Herron could not demonstrate harm done to the company from Jones' use of the name. Robinson participated as a witness in the trial but ultimately stated that she was not directly involved in the dispute, as she had surrendered her rights to use the name herself when she departed from the LLC years earlier. She also appeared as a judge in season two's Paramount Idol, alongside Bruce Flohr and Andy Waldeck.

=== 2014–2024: Solo career and The Funky Divas ===
In 2014, Jones began recording her first solo album with producer DJ King Assassin entitled, To the Max. Jones released a single "Didn't I" on May 15, 2014. In 2015, Jones began her own radio show called "Max Radio". In 2016, Jones went on tour for the stage-play "Suspicion, Lies, and Death by Pies!" by Teresa D. Ballard. In March 2017, Jones announced the forthcoming release of her autobiographical self-help book "A Smart Girls Guide to Girl Groups" in the summer through Welstar Publications, LLC. In June 2017, Jones released a cover version of "Don't Let Go (Love)" as a duet with Australian singer Greg Gould.

In October 2019, Jones reunited with En Vogue for an on-stage performance to salute music industry executive Sylvia Rhone at the City of Hope Gala 2019. This marked the first time all five members performed together. In late 2019, Jones and Dawn Robinson toured under the group name The Funky Divas but later disbanded in 2020. In November 2022, Jones released a single titled "Not Your Freak" featuring Big Freedia. In February 2024, Jones released a cover version of "We Don't Need Another Hero (Thunderdome)".

=== 2025–present: Return to En Vogue ===
In February 2025, Jones rejoined En Vogue.

== Artistry ==
=== Voice and songwriting ===
Maxine's vocal range spans three octaves and two notes. She is a classically trained soprano. As a member of En Vogue, Jones was often credited for harmonizing the low parts of their songs. Her lowest note was recorded on the song "Love Won't Take Me Out" wherein she sang a G♯_{2}. Her highest note was recorded on Silent Night (Happy Holiday Mix)", whereas she sang a B_{5} note. Jones often took on heavy songwriting in the group. She also sang lead vocals on their biggest hits including: "Whatta Man", "Don't Let Go (Love)", "Give It Up, Turn It Loose", and their signature song "My Lovin' (You're Never Gonna Get It)".

=== Influences ===
Jones names Chaka Khan as her major musical influence. Her musical influences also include Gladys Knight, Aretha Franklin, Tina Turner, Patti LaBelle. Jones' style is rooted in R&B and classic soul music, supplemented by bass and programmed drumbeats by Denzil Foster, Thomas McElroy.

== Discography ==
Singles

- "Didn't I" (2014)
- "Don't Let Go (Love)" (with Greg Gould) (2017)
- "Not Your Freak" (featuring Big Freedia) (2022)
- "Losing My Mind" (featuring OG Beatz) (2024)
- "Hero" (2024)
- "You Can't Have It" (featuring William T. Starzz) (2024)

with En Vogue

- Born to Sing (1990)
- Funky Divas (1992)
- Runaway Love (1993)
- EV3 (1997)
- Masterpiece Theatre (2000)

== Filmography ==
=== Films ===
| Year | Title | Role | Notes |
|---|---|---|---|
| 1995 | Batman Forever | Girl on the corner No. 1 / prostitute | Cameo appearance |

=== TV appearances ===
| Year | Title | Role | Episode |
|---|---|---|---|
| 1993 | In Living Color | Herself; cameo with En Vogue | "Stacy Koon's Police Academy" |
| 1993 | A Different World | Charity | "Mind Your Own Business" |
| 1993 | Roc | Jackie | "Joey in Love" "To Love and Die on Emerson Street: Part 1" "To Love and Die on Emerson Street: Part 2" |
| 2017 | The Hills | Waitress | "Watergate" |

=== Theatre appearances ===
| Year | Title | Role |
|---|---|---|
| 2016 | Suspicion, Lies, and Death by Pies! | Ms. Fellows |
