= Dawn Robinson =

American singer (born 1966)

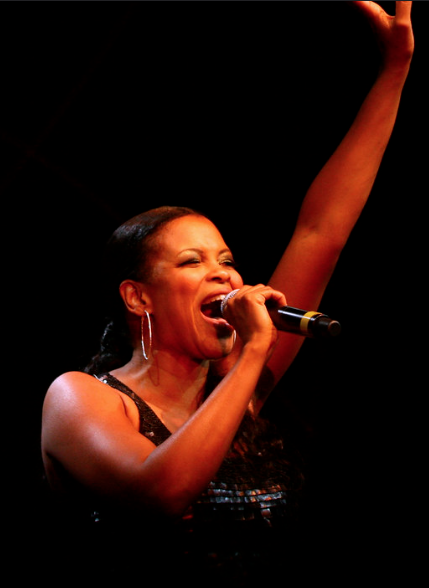
- Robinson performing in 2023

Background information
- Born: Dawn Sherrese Robinson; November 24, 1966 (age 59); New London, Connecticut, U.S.
- Origin: Oakland, California, U.S
- Genres: R&B; soul; dance-pop; hip hop; rock
- Occupations: Singer; actress
- Instrument: Vocals
- Years active: 1989–present
- Labels: Atlantic; eastwest; EMI; Interscope; Aftermath
- Formerly of: En Vogue; Lucy Pearl
- Spouse: Dre Allen (m. 2003; div. 2010)

Dawn Sherrese Robinson (born November 24, 1966) is an American singer and actress best known as a founding member of the R&B/pop group En Vogue, one of the world's best-selling girl groups of all time. Following her departure from En Vogue, Robinson joined Lucy Pearl and released their self-titled debut album Lucy Pearl in 2000, which went platinum worldwide and produced the successful singles "Dance Tonight" and "Don't Mess with My Man".

In 2002, Robinson released her first solo album Dawn, which produced the single "Envious". In 2005, Robinson rejoined En Vogue for a tour, but departed from the group before they could record another album. In 2009, Robinson briefly returned to En Vogue again for their 20th Anniversary Tour. In late 2011, she left En Vogue once again due to poor management and compensation of work. In 2013, she joined the cast of R&B Divas: Los Angeles for the first season of the series.

Over her career, Robinson has sold a combined total of over 11 million records as a member of En Vogue, Lucy Pearl and a solo artist. Her work with En Vogue has earned her several awards and nominations, including two American Music Awards, a Billboard Music Award, seven MTV Video Music Awards, four Soul Train Music Awards and eight Grammy nominations.

== Early life and education ==
Born on November 24, 1966 (some sources cite her birth year as 1968) in New London, Connecticut, Robinson was the oldest of three children born to John W. Robinson (1943–2014) and Barbara Alexander. During her childhood, Robinson sang in the choir at AME Zion Church in Connecticut. Shortly thereafter, Robinson began recording music in the studio, traveling from New London to Massachusetts.

During a Stephanie Mills concert, Robinson's mother was able to get the band to listen to a tape of Robinson. The band advised Robinson's mother to send her to California. In 1980, Robinson, then age 13, relocated to California, where she lived with an older cousin. In 1981, Robinson's mother and sister joined her in California, settling in Oakland. For high school, Robinson first attended Oakland High School and later graduated from San Leandro High School in 1984. She later attended the Institute of Cosmetology in Oakland.

== Career ==
=== 1989–1997: En Vogue ===
In July 1989, Robinson auditioned for a female group. Robinson was one of four women selected to become part of the group, which became En Vogue. In August 1989, the four began recording their debut album, and completed it in December 1989. In 1990, En Vogue released their first single "Hold On", which became a number-one single. In April 1990, the group released their debut album Born to Sing, which went platinum.

In 1992, the group released their next multi-platinum album, Funky Divas. Robinson sang lead vocals on the album's top-charting singles, which included "My Lovin' (You're Never Gonna Get It)", "Giving Him Something He Can Feel", and "Free Your Mind", which remains one of their signature songs. "Free Your Mind" won two MTV Video Music Awards, for "Best R&B Video" and "Best Dance Video". In September 1993, En Vogue released an EP, titled Runaway Love. The extended play featured Robinson's lead vocals on the number-one hit "Whatta Man", for which she was nominated for Best R&B performance in 1995. The song featured Salt-n-Pepa and appeared on Salt-n-Pepa's Very Necessary album.

In 1996, En Vogue recorded "Don't Let Go (Love)", with Robinson singing lead vocals. The song featured on the soundtrack to the New Line motion picture Set It Off. Released in the autumn, it became the group's biggest hit to date, going number one worldwide. It sold millions of copies and was certified platinum by the RIAA. It was the last En Vogue single to feature Robinson. One of Robinson's last performances with the group was in October 1996, when the group sang the last national anthem rendition in the history of Atlanta–Fulton County Stadium in Atlanta, which came in game five of the 1996 World Series.

In response to the large commercial success of "Don't Let Go (Love)", the group steadfastly went to work on its third album. In March 1997, as the album was nearing completion, Robinson chose to leave the group and sign with Dr. Dre's label Aftermath after difficult contractual negotiations reached a stalemate. Despite Robinson's abrupt departure, En Vogue resolved to continue as a trio. Later in 1997, Robinson contributed to The Firm on their song "Firm Biz" which sampled Teena Marie's single "Square Biz".

=== 1999–2000: Lucy Pearl ===
In 1999, Robinson appeared in and recorded the jazz classic "Drop Me Off in Harlem" for the Wyclef Jean-composed film Life. Later in 1999, Robinson joined Lucy Pearl. In May 2000, the group released their self-titled debut album Lucy Pearl on EMI Records, which sold over a million copies worldwide. The album's lead single "Dance Tonight" charted at number five on the R&B singles chart and at number 35 on the Billboard Hot 100. Following the release of their album, Lucy Pearl toured in the United States and overseas, making several television appearances on talk shows, including The Tonight Show with Jay Leno, The Chris Rock Show and Later with Jools Holland.

In October 2000, Lucy Pearl released the second single "Don't Mess with My Man", which became the group's most successful single in the UK, peaking at number 20 in the UK Singles Chart. It garnered success in France where it peaked at number 14. In the United States, the song was just as successful as their debut single "Dance Tonight", peaking at number 35 on the Billboard Hot 100. Shortly after the release of their second single, Robinson left the group due to the lack of fair compensation within the group. After unsuccessfully trying to negotiate a fair agreement with her bandmate Raphael Saadiq, Robinson quit the group and was replaced by Joi. Lucy Pearl disbanded in 2001 and did not release a second album.

=== 2002–2006: Dawn and return to En Vogue ===
In January 2002, after leaving Aftermath, Robinson released a solo album titled Dawn, on "Q Records", a division of QVC and Atlantic Records. Robinson went on several national telecasts promoting the single. In 2005, after an eight-year absence, Robinson reunited En Vogue. With Robinson part of En Vogue, completing the original line-up, they signed with one of the industry's largest management firms, The Firm Management Group.

In September 2005, they joined Salt-n-Pepa for the girl groups' first-ever joint public performance of their 1994 hit, "Whatta Man" at VH-1's Hip Hop Honors. They earned another Grammy nomination for the single "So What the Fuss", which featured Stevie Wonder and Prince on guitar. The group appeared in the single's music video. After failing to agree on business terms, Robinson again chose to leave En Vogue and was replaced by Rhona Bennett. As a result, En Vogue was let go from Firm Management.

=== 2008–2011: Solo career and final return to En Vogue ===
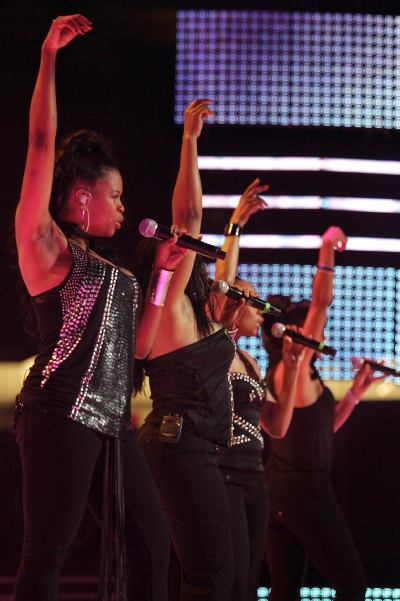
Robinson on the left, performing with En Vogue during their reunion tour, 2009

In April 2008, Robinson started touring and doing private events, performing songs she recorded with En Vogue and Lucy Pearl. Later in 2008, Robinson reunited with En Vogue and performed at the 2008 BET Awards along with Alicia Keys with fellow 1990s R&B girl groups SWV, and TLC. In 2009, Robinson joined En Vogue for their "20th Anniversary Tour". In 2010, all four members appeared on the cover of Jet magazine to promote their reunion tour.

Following their reunion tour, Robinson decided not to record on the new En Vogue album due in the autumn of 2011 after failing to reach an agreement. In September 2011, Ellis, Jones & Herron, without Robinson, debuted their new single "I'll Cry Later" from their forthcoming album that was planned for a December release. Negotiations for the album release resulted in Robinson leaving En Vogue. Jones discussed this with Access Hollywood in October 2012. Robinson and Jones talked about the contract issues and poor management of En Vogue.

=== 2012: Heirs to the Throne ===
In October 2012, Robinson and Maxine Jones appeared on Access Hollywood to announce they are forming a new, two-piece girl group named Heirs to the Throne. The duo launched their website, Twitter, and Facebook for the new group. They also performed at several venues. In 2013, Robinson and Jones parted ways. Jones formed her own group called "En Vogue to the Max".

It was later announced that the former group mates Cindy Herron and Terry Ellis sued Maxine Jones for use of the En Vogue name, and demanded $1 million in damages. However, Ellis and Herron could not demonstrate harm done to the company from Jones' use of the name. Robinson participated as a witness in the trial but ultimately stated that she was not directly involved in the dispute, as she had surrendered her rights to use the name herself when she departed from the LLC years earlier.

=== 2013–2018: R&B Divas and solo career ===
In 2013, Robinson joined the cast of R&B Divas: Los Angeles. The series premiered on TV One in July 2013. Throughout the series, Robinson participated in several performances but chose not to appear on the reunion episode.

Robinson was to begin touring with selected cast members from both R&B Divas LA and Atlanta within the United States. In November 2014, on TMZ Live, Robinson threatened to sue Lifetime if it did not change its marketing which falsely claimed the four original members were involved in An En Vogue Christmas, a film with only two original En Vogue members (Cindy Herron and Terry Ellis) and Rhona Bennett. In 2017, Robinson told Hollywood correspondent Noreen Lanie she is working on a new album. A release date was not been confirmed.

=== 2019–2025: The Funky Divas, retirement from music ===
In October 2019, Robinson reunited with En Vogue for an on-stage performance to salute music industry executive Sylvia Rhone at the City of Hope Gala 2019. This marked the first time where all five members performed together.

== Personal life ==
Robinson was married to Andre "Dre" Allen from 2003 until 2010.

In March 2025, Robinson revealed that she was homeless and had been living out of her car since 2022. Her former husband Allen said in response that he would offer her a job.

== Discography ==
Studio albums

- Dawn (2002)

== Filmography ==
=== Films ===
Year	Title	Role
1990	Another 48 Hrs.	Restroom Girl
1995	Tank Girl	Model
1995	Batman Forever	Girl on Corner #4
1997	Conceiving Ada	Club Patron
1998	The Rugrats Movie	Newborn Baby (singing voice)
1999	Life	Club Crooner
2000	Shaft	Lenox Lounge Patron
2006	The Last Request	Amber
2010	Queen of Media	Wok Pd

=== Television ===
Year	Title	Role	Episode
1990	Soul Train	Herself	Episode: "Tyler Collins/EnVogue"
1992	Later... with Jools Holland	Herself	Episode: "Episode #1.6"
1993	In Living Color	Herself	2 episodes
1993	Sesame Street	Herself	Episode: "Telly Pretends to be Triangle Man"
1993	A Different World	Henrietta	Episode: "Mind Your Own Business"
1993	Roc	The Downtown Divas	Recurring cast: season 2
1995	SeaQuest DSV	Sarah Toenin	Episode: "Watergate"
2013	R&B Divas: Los Angeles	Herself	Main cast: season 1
2013	Life After	Herself	Episode: "Sheryl Lee Ralph: Life After Dreamgirls"
