= Sparkle (2012 soundtrack) =

Sparkle: Original Motion Picture Soundtrack

Soundtrack album by Various Artists
- Released: July 31, 2012
- Recorded: 2011–12
- Genres: Soul; R&B; disco
- Length: 36:45
- Label: RCA Records
- Producers: R. Kelly; Jameel Roberts; The Underdogs; Chuck Harmony; Claude Kelly; Bigg Makk; Andrew "Pop" Wansel

Singles from Sparkle: Original Motion Picture Soundtrack
- 1. "Celebrate" Released: June 5, 2012; 2. "His Eye Is on the Sparrow" Released: June 8, 2012

Sparkle: Original Motion Picture Soundtrack is the soundtrack album for the 2012 Sony/TriStar Pictures film Sparkle, a remake of the 1976 film of the same name. The album was released through Sony Music Entertainment's RCA Records on July 31, 2012. The film's soundtrack includes new recordings of four songs from the original film's soundtrack as well as new original music by Jordin Sparks, Whitney Houston and Cee Lo Green. The soundtrack's first official lead single is the last song recorded by Whitney Houston before she died on February 11, 2012, a duet with R&B/pop singer and American Idol winner Jordin Sparks on a song called "Celebrate". The song premiered on On Air with Ryan Seacrest on May 21, 2012 and was made available for digital download on iTunes on June 5. Whitney Houston's other track, "His Eye is On the Sparrow", debuted only one day after the premiere of "Celebrate". The official music video for "Celebrate" was filmed on May 30, 2012. It made its world premiere on BET's 106 & Park on June 27, 2012.

== Background ==
The songs on the soundtrack are performed by the actors in the film, including Jordin Sparks, Whitney Houston, Cee Lo Green, Carmen Ejogo, Tika Sumpter, and others. Sparkle features songs from the original film written by soul musician Curtis Mayfield as well as new compositions by R&B artist R. Kelly and others. The soundtrack includes new songs not present in the 1976 version of Sparkle: "Celebrate", "His Eye is On the Sparrow", among others. "Celebrate" was sent to radio the week of May 21, 2012 as the first official from the Sparkle soundtrack. The song premiered on On Air with Ryan Seacrest on May 21. and was made available for digital download on iTunes on June 5. Houston's other track, "His Eye is On the Sparrow", debuted only one day after the premiere of "Celebrate".

== Composition ==
=== Music and themes ===
Sparkle: Original Motion Picture Soundtrack takes on matters of the celebration, heartache, heartbreak and seduction with a mixture of ballads, mid- and up-tempos.

== Release ==
The Sparkle: Original Motion Picture Soundtrack was released on July 31, 2012; though announced with 13 tracks, it was released with only 11 tracks. The entire soundtrack was made available to stream exclusively through Jordin Sparks' Official store and Essence.com five days prior to its official release. Jordin Sparks, who worked closely with Houston throughout the making of Sparkle, finds the release of the soundtrack to be "bittersweet." Sparks states, "I worked with my idol and that was a dream come true. I used to watch the Cinderella adaptation with her and Brandy every day after school. But she should really be here promoting it with me and [it's] really hard for me to be doing it alone."

== Reception ==
=== Critical response ===
Professional ratings
Review scores
Source	Rating
Allmusic	3.5/5 stars
Entertainment Weekly	(B)
Rolling Stone	3.5/5 stars

AllMusic writer Andy Kellman gave it three and a half out of five stars and called the soundtrack "an enjoyable if muddled affair" and commended the four songs covered on the new soundtrack stating "the 2012 soundtrack features faithful and decent covers of four songs from the original. When it comes to "Something He Can Feel," it would be an understatement to say that the deck is stacked against Sparks and her vocal partners, Carmen Ejogo and Tika Sumpter." Entertainment Weekly's Melissa Maerz gave Sparkle: Original Motion Picture Soundtrack a B rating and praised Sparks version of "Look Into Your Heart" stating "Sparks bellows Mayfield's power ballad Look Into Your Heart with absolute conviction. Jody Rosen of Rolling Stone gave the soundtrack 3½ of 5 stars, commenting that "Sparkle revives four soul chestnuts and includes three originals written and produced by R. Kelly. It's the second-most-satisfying retro-soul album of the year – after Kelly's Write Me Back"; however, he was ambivalent towards Houston's last two recordings before her death, saying that, "Celebrate is forgettable disco-pop, and on the gospel standard "His Eye Is on the Sparrow" Houston sings – and croaks – in a voice octaves lower than in her prime. At times the song has a ravaged magnificence, but mostly it's painful."

=== Chart performance ===
- For the week ending August 18, 2012 the soundtrack debuted on the Billboard 200 at # 26, # 7 on the Billboard R&B/Hip-Hop Albums and # 1 on the Billboard Top Soundtracks Albums, selling 12,000 copies in its first week. To date, the soundtrack has sold 86,000 copies.

== Singles ==
"Celebrate" is the first official single from the soundtrack. It is the last song recorded by Whitney Houston before she died on February 11, 2012, a duet featuring her and R&B/pop singer Jordin Sparks. It was officially released on June 5, 2012 for digital download and it was written by R. Kelly who also produced the track. For the week June 16, 2012, "Celebrate" debuted at number 34 on the US Adult R&B Airplay chart, having amassed 45 spins for that week ending. During that same week, "Celebrate" also debuted at number 84 on the US Hot R&B/Hip-Hop Songs chart, and has since peaked at number 54. The music video for "Celebrate" was filmed on May 30, 2012. A preview of the video premiered on Entertainment Tonight on June 4, 2012. The music video made its world premiere on BET's 106 & Park on June 27, 2012.

"His Eye Is on the Sparrow" is the second official single from the soundtrack. The song is a gospel hymn performed by Whitney Houston. Houston is seen performing the song in a church scene in the film trailer. The song was officially released on June 8, 2012 for digital download from Amazon and iTunes. The song was originally written in 1905 by lyricist Civilla D. Martin and composer Charles H. Gabriel. The song is most associated with actress-singer Ethel Waters who used the title for her autobiography.

== Track listing ==
Credited singers on each track are marked with parentheses. Credits adapted from Sparkle: Original Motion Picture Soundtrack liner notes.

No.	Title	Writer(s)	Producer(s)	Length
1.	"I'm a Man" (Cee Lo Green)	Thomas DeCarlo Callaway, Kevin Risto, Waynne Nugent, Charlie Gambetta	The MIDI Mafia	3:09
2.	"Yes I Do" (Carmen Ejogo)	Guordan Banks, Warren Felder, Andrew Wansel	Oak	3:14
3.	"Running" (Goapele)	Charles Harmon, Claude Kelly	Chuck Harmony, Claude Kelly	3:16
4.	"Jump" (Carmen Ejogo, Jordin Sparks and Tika Sumpter)	Curtis Mayfield	Pop Wansel, Oak, Ronald "Flippa" Colson*	2:28
5.	"Hooked on Your Love" (Carmen Ejogo, Jordin Sparks and Tika Sumpter)	Curtis Mayfield	Pop Wansel, Ronald "Flippa" Colson*, Jameel Roberts*	4:09
6.	"Something He Can Feel" (Carmen Ejogo, Jordin Sparks and Tika Sumpter)	Curtis Mayfield	R. Kelly, Bigg Makk	3:28
7.	"His Eye Is on the Sparrow" (Whitney Houston)	Civilla D. Martin, Charles H. Gabriel	The Underdogs	3:32
8.	"Look into Your Heart" (Jordin Sparks)	Curtis Mayfield	Oak	2:26
9.	"One Wing" (Jordin Sparks)	R. Kelly	R. Kelly, Bigg Makk	4:15
10.	"Love Will" (Jordin Sparks)	R. Kelly	R. Kelly	3:12
11.	"Celebrate" (Whitney Houston and Jordin Sparks)	R. Kelly	R. Kelly	3:36
Total length:				36:45

Notes

(*) donates as co-producer

== Charts ==
Chart (2012)	Peak position
South Korean International Albums (Gaon)	11
US Billboard 200	21
US Top R&B/Hip-Hop Albums	3
US Soundtrack Albums	1

== Credits and personnel ==
- Adapted from allmusic.com.

Creativity and management

- Debra Martin Chase – Executive Producer
- T.D. Jakes – Executive Producer
- Erwin Gorostiza – Art Direction, Design
- Donnie Meadows – Production Coordination
- Carlos Taylor – Production Coordination
- Mara Brock Akil – Executive Producer
- Salim Akil – Executive Producer
- Trina Bowman – Production Coordination
- Tanisha Broadwater – Production Coordination

Performances

- Jordin Sparks – Primary Artist
- Whitney Houston – Primary Artist
- Cee Lo Green – Primary Artist
- Olga Konospelsky – Background Vocals
- Emma Kummrow – Background Vocals
- Charles Parker – Background Vocals
- Tika Sumpter – Primary Artist
- Carmen Ejogo – Primary Artist
- Goapele – Primary Artist
- R. Kelly – Additional Vocals
- The Rumor – Background Vocals
- Voices of Praise – Background Vocals
- Eliza Cho – Background Vocals

Technical

- Bigg Makk – Arranger, Bass, Keyboards, producer
- R. Kelly – Arranger, composer, Keyboards, Mixing, producer
- David Boyd – Assistant
- Michael Daley – Assistant
- Trehy Harris – Assistant
- Dabling Harward – Assistant
- James Jones III – Bass
- Ray Nesmith – Bass
- Matt Taylor – Bass
- Maria C. Ward – Cello
- Joan Collaso – Choir/Chorus
- Yvonne Gage – Choir/Chorus
- Pastor Chris Harris – Choir/Chorus
- Mike Harvey – Choir/Chorus
- Jeff Morrow – Choir/Chorus
- Lauren Pilot Morrow – Choir/Chorus
- Robin Robinson – Choir/Chorus
- Claude Kelly – Composer, producer, Vocal Producer
- Guordan Banks – Composer, Vocals
- Thomas DeCarlo Callaway – Composer
- Warren Felder – Composer
- Charles Gabriel – Composer
- Charlie Gambetta – Composer
- Charles Harmon – Composer
- Curtis Mayfield – Composer
- Waynne Nugent – Composer
- Kevin Risto – Composer
- Andrew Wansel – Composer
- Autoro "Toro" Whitfield – Drums, Engineer, Piano
- Margis Miles – Drums
- Abel Garibaldi – Engineer, Programming
- Andrew Hey – Engineer, Vocal Engineer
- The MIDI Mafia – Engineer, producer
- Ian Mereness – Engineer, Programming
- Benjamin Adamson – Engineer
- Mike "TrakGuru" Johnson – Engineer
- Craig White – Engineer
- Joel Geddis – Guitar
- Donnie Lyle – Guitar
- Andrew Meixner – Guitar
- Ben Oniel – Guitar
- Mark Strowbridge – Guitar
- Harry Wilson – Guitar
- Dexter Wansel – Horn Arrangements, String Arrangements
- The Regiment – Horn
- Kenneth Crouch – Keyboards, Organ
- Rodney East – Keyboards
- Herb Powers Jr. – Mastering
- Phil Seaford – Mixing Assistant
- Dirty Swift – Mixing, Programming
- Harvey Mason Jr. – Mixing, Vocal Producer
- Kevin "KD" Davis – Mixing
- Serban Ghenea – Mixing
- John Hanes – Mixing
- Jaycen Joshua – Mixing
- Spring Aspers – Music Supervisor
- Kier Lehman – Music Supervisor
- Chuck Harmony – Musician, producer, Vocal Producer
- The Underdogs – Musician, producer
- Jameel Roberts – Organ, producer
- Ronald "Flippa" Colson @Flippa123 – Producer
- Pop Wansel – Producer
- Bruce Waynne – Programming
- Ron Kerber – Saxophone
- Hitomi Oba – Saxophone
- Paul Arbogast – Trombone
- Michael Jorosz – Trumpet
- Tom Terrell – Trumpet
- Nina Cottman – Viola
- Ruth S. Fraizier – Viola

== Release history ==
List of radio and release dates with formats and record labels
Region	Release date	Format	Label
Australia	July 27, 2012	CD, digital download	RCA Records
Belgium	July 27, 2012	CD, digital download	RCA Records
Denmark	July 27, 2012	CD, digital download	RCA Records
Finland	July 27, 2012	CD, digital download	RCA Records
France	July 27, 2012	CD, digital download	RCA Records
Japan	July 27, 2012	CD, digital download	RCA Records
Netherlands	July 27, 2012	CD, digital download	RCA Records
New Zealand	July 27, 2012	CD, digital download	RCA Records
Norway	July 27, 2012	CD, digital download	RCA Records
Sweden	July 27, 2012	CD, digital download	RCA Records
United States	July 31, 2012	CD, digital download	RCA Records
Canada	July 31, 2012	CD, digital download	RCA Records
Mexico	July 31, 2012	CD, digital download	RCA Records
