= Celebrate (Whitney Houston and Jordin Sparks song) =

Single by Whitney Houston and Jordin Sparks

from the album Sparkle: Original Motion Picture Soundtrack
- Released: June 5, 2012
- Recorded: 2011 – February 7, 2012
- Studio: The Chocolate Factory (Chicago, IL)
- Genre: Soul; R&B
- Length: 3:35
- Label: RCA
- Songwriter: R. Kelly
- Producer: R. Kelly

Whitney Houston singles chronology
"Million Dollar Bill" (2009)	"Celebrate" (2012)	"His Eye Is on the Sparrow" (2012)

Jordin Sparks singles chronology
"I Am Woman" (2011)	"Celebrate" (2012)	"Double Tap" (2015)

Music video
- "Celebrate" on YouTube

"Celebrate" is a duet by American singers Whitney Houston and Jordin Sparks. It was written and produced by R. Kelly for the soundtrack album Sparkle to the 2012 musical drama film of the same name. The film starred Houston and Sparks. RCA Records released "Celebrate" as the first official single from the soundtrack.

It is the last song recorded by Houston before she died on February 11, 2012. It was officially released as Houston's first posthumous single release on June 5, 2012 for digital download on iTunes and Amazon. The song made its US radio premiere on On Air with Ryan Seacrest on May 21, 2012.

The accompanying music video for the song was filmed on May 30, 2012. The video was shot over two days by director Marcus Raboy and made its world premiere on BET's 106 & Park on June 27, 2012.

The song found success after its release, reaching the top ten on the Billboard Adult R&B Songs and Gospel Digital Song Sales charts, and also reaching the top 40 of both the Adult Contemporary and Hot R&B/Hip-Hop Songs charts. On the latter chart, Houston achieved a milestone 40th top 40 hit on the latter chart. It received a Best Song nomination at the Black Reel Awards and won the Soul Train Music Award for Best Gospel/Inspirational Song at the 2012 ceremony.

== Background and recording ==
Between October and December 2011, Whitney Houston and Jordin Sparks filmed their roles for the film readaptation of Sparkle in Detroit. That year, Houston was reassigned to RCA Records, following the dissolution of her longtime label Arista. RCA later won rights to distribute and release the upcoming soundtrack on the film to which both Houston and Sparks contributed songs and to which would be produced by R. Kelly. Houston would record two songs for the soundtrack, including a rendition of "His Eye Is on the Sparrow".

In early 2012, Houston and Sparks were assigned the Kelly-composed song "Celebrate". While Kelly produced the composition and Sparks' vocals in Chicago, Houston traveled to Los Angeles in February where she recorded the song with Harvey Mason Jr. as an associate producer. Houston recorded her vocals on February 7.

Just four days later, Houston accidentally drowned in her bathtub at her hotel suite at The Beverly Hilton a day before the 54th Annual Grammy Awards. Sparks later added extra ad-libs and can be heard in the end saying "we miss you Whitney".

== Release ==
RCA released the song as the leading single from the film's soundtrack on June 5, 2012 to digital download stores such as iTunes and Amazon.

The song made its US radio premiere on On Air with Ryan Seacrest a month prior on May 21, 2012.

== Composition ==
"Celebrate" is a soul and R&B mid tempo song influenced by 1960s themed music. Jason Lipshutz of Billboard wrote that the song "is a relentlessly optimistic jam that seamlessly interweaves Sparks' American Idol-winning vocals with those of her idol". During the second verse, Houston sings: "Though we've been going through changes / Just trying to make it from day to day / Tonight, don't you worry about a thing / Just cast your cares away", before the chorus returns.

== Critical reception ==
"Celebrate" received positive reviews from music critics. Jason Lipshutz of Billboard called the song "a relentlessly optimistic jam that seamlessly interweaves Jordin Sparks American Idol-winning vocals with those of her idol".

== Chart performance ==
For the week June 16, 2012, "Celebrate" debuted at number 34 on the Billboard Adult R&B Airplay chart, eventually reaching number ten for the week of September 1, 2012, becoming Houston's 14th top ten single on the chart, which at the time tied her with Toni Braxton and Alicia Keys for the second most top tens on the chart for a female artist.

During that same week, "Celebrate" also debuted at number 84 on the Billboard Hot R&B/Hip-Hop Songs chart and peaked at number 39. It was Houston's milestone fortieth top 40 R&B hit.

The song debuted and peaked on the Billboard adult contemporary chart at number 26, becoming Houston's 32nd top 40th hit on that chart.

The song also reached number nine on the Gospel Digital Song Sales chart, becoming Houston's tenth top ten single off that chart and Sparks' first.

== Music video ==
=== Background ===
A shot of Sparks wearing a Whitney Houston I'm Your Baby Tonight T-shirt in a special ode to the late singer in the video.

A shot of the Sparkle cast dancing during Whitney's verse.

The music video for "Celebrate" was filmed on May 30, 2012. The video was shot over two days in down town Los Angeles and is directed by Marcus Raboy. A preview of the video premiered on Entertainment Tonight on June 4, 2012. The music video made its world premiere on BET's 106 & Park on June 27, 2012. The music video treatment originally was set to include both Sparks and Houston, but with her unexpected passing, the treatment had been changed.

Sparks says "When we did the song, we planned on it being Whitney and me. But she's not here, so we wanted to make it a tribute to her. So it's fun, upbeat and exciting — there are clips from the movie and the main cast is in the video too. It's me, Tika Sumpter, Carmen Ejogo, Derek Luke, Omari Hardwick ... Goapele is in it and Mike Epps. We're all just having a good time [and the premise is] they all come over to my house singing along to Whitney's music. And we're missing her and celebrating her as well. It's actually pretty simple, but when you watch it and hear her voice along with it, it makes it so much more."

=== Synopsis ===
Sparks hosts a house party at her place with fellow cast members of Sparkle in attendance. Throughout the video, Footage from Sparkle, mainly focusing on Houston, is spliced in throughout the clip. Houston's scenes in the music video show the late singer in her acting prime as she smiles in many of the clips then cries in another. The final shot of the music video is an image of Houston from the film. "Celebrate" is dedicated to Houston's memory.

=== Reception ===
The video was met with positive reception. Rebecca Ford of TheHollywoodReporter.com calls it "a very positive and uplifting video". Sabrina Rojas Weiss from VH1 said "For a while now, we've been thinking of Sparkle as "the movie that makes us really sad about Whitney Houston." We probably weren't alone". She concluded "which is why the release of the video "Celebrate" was a brilliant move". Tanner Stransky of Entertainment Weekly praised the video saying "It feels triumphant, in a way, that they carried on [The Video] without Houston". Byron Flitsch from MTV.com says "we're really loving is the storyline that weaves in a montage of movie scenes" he went on to say "it's the emotional, almost home-movie quality honoring Whitney's on-screen presence that gets us all kinds of sentimental".

== Awards and nominations ==
Year	Award	Category	Work	Result
2012	Soul Train Awards	"Best Gospel Inspiration Performance"	"Celebrate"	Won
2013	Black Reel Awards	"Best Original Song"	"Celebrate"	Nominated

== Track listing ==
- Digital download
1. "Celebrate" – 3:35

== Credits and personnel ==
Credits adapted from Sparkle: Original Motion Picture Soundtrack liner notes.

- Recorded at The Chocolate Factory, Chicago, IL
- Mixed by Serban Ghenea at MixStar Studios, Virginia Beach, VA
- Lead vocals – Whitney Houston & Jordin Sparks
- Composition, Production, Arrangement, co-mixing, Keyboards & Additional Vocals – R. Kelly
- Vocal Production – Harvey Mason, Jr.
- Guitar – Donnie Lyle
- Bass – Bigg Makk
- Additional Keyboards – Bigg Makk, Rodney East
- Choir – Joan Collaso, Yvonne Gage, Pastor Chris Harris, Mike Harvey, Jeff Morrow, Lauren Pilot Morrow, Robin Robinson
- Recording & Programming – Ian Mereness, Abel Garibaldi
- Vocals Recorded by Andrew Hey at Mason Sound, North Hollywood, CA
- Assisted by Davad Boyd, Micheal Daley & Dabling Harward
- Engineering – John Hanes
- Assistant Engineer – Phil Seaford

== Charts ==
Chart (2012)	Peak position
Japan Hot 100 (Billboard)	48
South Korea International (Circle)	77
US Hot R&B/Hip-Hop Songs (Billboard)	39
US Adult Contemporary (Billboard)	26
US Adult R&B Songs (Billboard)	10
US Gospel Digital Songs (Billboard)	9

== Radio and release history ==
List of radio and release dates with formats and record labels
Country	Radio or release date	Format	Label
United States	May 21, 2012	Radio premiere	RCA Records
United States	June 5, 2012	Digital download	RCA Records
Canada	June 5, 2012	Digital download	RCA Records
Mexico	June 5, 2012	Digital download	RCA Records
Australia	June 5, 2012	Digital download	RCA Records
Belgium	June 5, 2012	Digital download	RCA Records
Denmark	June 5, 2012	Digital download	RCA Records
Finland	June 5, 2012	Digital download	RCA Records
France	June 5, 2012	Digital download	RCA Records
Japan	June 5, 2012	Digital download	RCA Records
Netherlands	June 5, 2012	Digital download	RCA Records
New Zealand	June 5, 2012	Digital download	RCA Records
Norway	June 5, 2012	Digital download	RCA Records
Sweden	June 5, 2012	Digital download	RCA Records
United States	June 18, 2012	Adult contemporary radio	RCA Records
