= Ejogo =

Ejogo is a surname. Notable people with the surname include:

- Carmen Ejogo (born 1973), British actress and singer
- Charles Ejogo (born 1976), British entrepreneur
