= Dwan Smith =

American actress

- Born: January 22, 1944 (age 81); Jackson, Tennessee, U.S.
- Occupations: Actress; singer; model
- Years active: 1970–2001
- Known for: Deloris – Sparkle
- Spouse: Nathaniel Fortier (m. 1978)
- Children: 3

Dwan Smith (born January 22, 1944) is an American television and film actress, singer and model. Smith is perhaps best known for her role as Delores Williams in the 1976 musical drama film Sparkle.

== Biography ==
=== Early life and education ===
Born one of four children to Virgil (b. 1917; d. 1990) and Adaliah Smith in Jackson, Tennessee, Smith attended University of Wisconsin. After graduating from college in 1966, Smith relocated to Los Angeles, California. Prior to her career, Smith taught speech therapy to kindergartens. In 1969, Smith won the title of "Ms Zodiac of 1969", an astrological beauty contest held in Hollywood, California. Smith later won the title of "Mrs. California" in 1985.

=== Career ===
In 1972, she made her television debut on the series Adam-12. This was followed by roles in television movies such as the unsold television film A Very Missing Person, and The Couple Takes a Wife. She began making regular appearances on television shows such as Emergency!, Room 222, Sanford & Son, Ellery Queen, Owen Marshall: Counselor at Law, Barnaby Jones, The Jeffersons, Joe Forrester and Police Story.

In 1975, Smith was cast in the role of Delores Williams in the American musical drama Sparkle, her best-known role which was released in April 1976. Smith starred opposite singer-actresses Irene Cara and Lonette McKee, who portrayed her sisters Sparkle and Sister, respectively. Although the character "Sister" was the eldest of the three sisters, Smith (aged 31 at the time) was ten years older than McKee and fourteen years older than Cara. Smith was also eight years younger than Mary Alice who portrayed their mother, Effie. In the film, Smith performed backing vocals to the Curtis Mayfield-penned songs, "Something He Can Feel," "Hooked On Your Love," and "Jump" (which were all re-recorded by Aretha Franklin for the entire soundtrack).

Smith continued to make appearances in films such as Cop on the Beat, Brothers (opposite Bernie Casey), the ill-fated and critically panned The Concorde... Airport '79 and Hell Squad followed by her role of Dr. Irma Foster on the soap opera General Hospital, a role she played from 1987 to 1989.

Since her role in Sparkle, Smith largely faded from television and film altogether, appearing in the direct-to-video MP Da Last Don (1998) as Master P's mother, In The Wake (2000) and House Party 4: Down to the Last Minute (2001) as Mrs. Dixon. The film is marked as Smith's last role to date.

== Personal ==
Smith has been married twice and has three children. In August 1978, she married Nathaniel Fortier. On August 3, 2011, Smith recently appeared in a YouTube video via her channel 'mizdwan4' to which she was to reveal her sexuality for the first time. However, the secret comes out as her love and addiction for all types of wigs.
