= Send the Light (hymn) =

- Hymn by Charles H. Gabriel
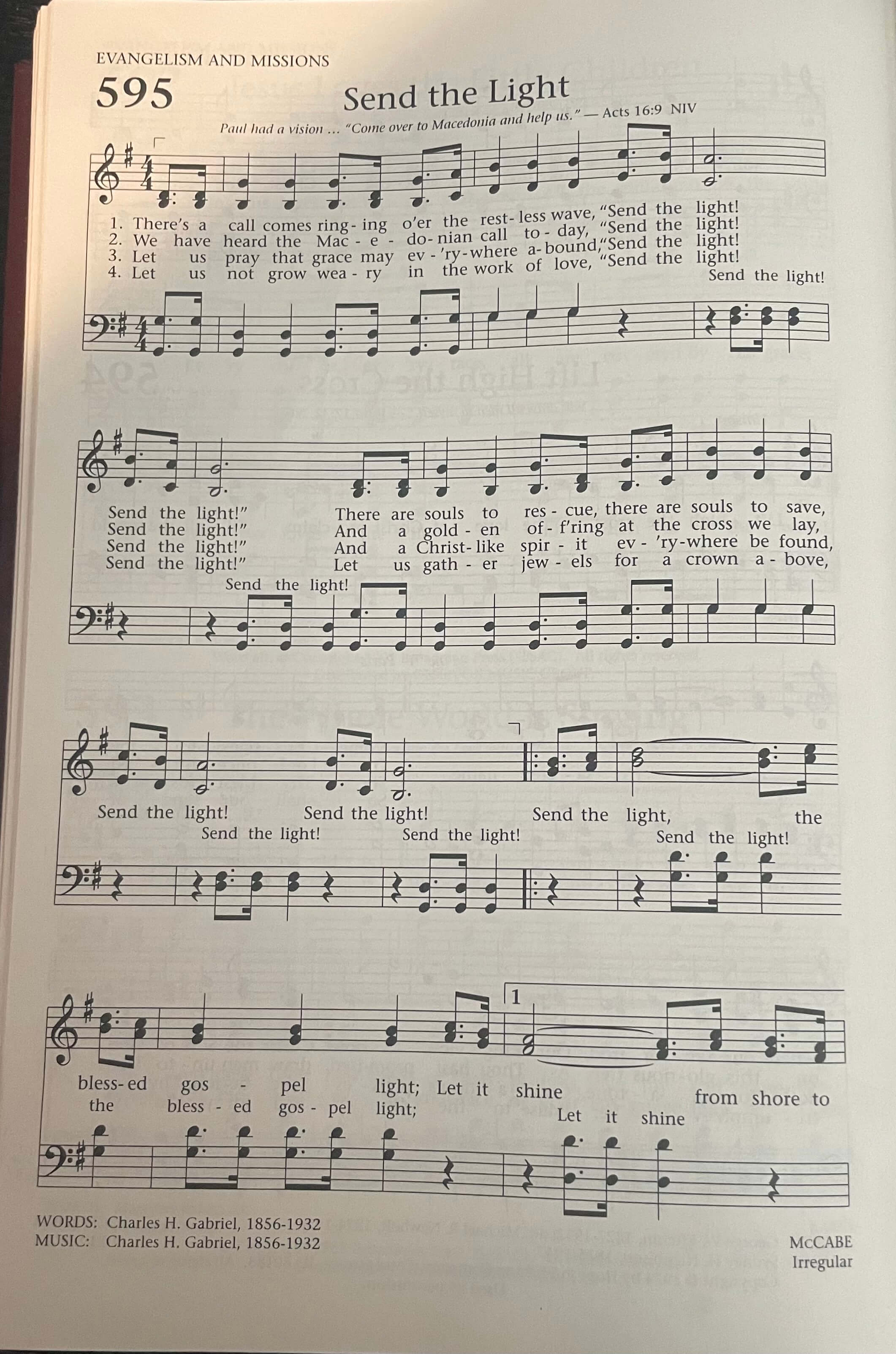
- Send the Light 1991 Baptist Hymnal
- Year: 1890
- Genre: Hymn
- Bible text: Acts 16:9
- Meter: 11.6.11.6

"Send the Light" is a hymn written in 1890 by American composer Charles H. Gabriel. The hymn was the first composed by Gabriel, who would later compose multiple famous hymns, such as "His Eye Is on the Sparrow" and "Will the Circle be Unbroken?".

Gabriel wrote the hymn when he was serving as the music director of Grace Methodist Episcopal Church in San Francisco, California, when he was asked by the Sunday school superintendent of the church to write a missionary hymn for Easter church service. The hymn was first sung a month before Easter on March 6, 1890. It is believed to be based on Acts 16, where Paul has a vision of a Macedonian man, who said, "Come over into Macedonia, and help us."

After Gabriel wrote the hymn, a field secretary of missions took the song from California to Ohio, where Charles Cardwell McCabe popularized the song. Soon after, Gabriel wrote "Calling the Prodigal."

== Lyrics ==
1. There’s a call comes ringing o’er the restless wave, “Send the light! Send the light!” There are souls to rescue, there are souls to save, Send the light! Send the light!
  - Refrain: Send the light, the blessed Gospel light; Let it shine from shore to shore! Send the light, and let its radiant beams Light the world forevermore!
2. We have heard the Macedonian call today, “Send the light! Send the light!” And a golden off’ring at the cross we lay, Send the light! Send the light!
3. Let us pray that grace may everywhere abound, “Send the light! Send the light!” And a Christlike spirit everywhere be found, Send the light! Send the light!
4. Let us not grow weary in the work of love, “Send the light! Send the light!” Let us gather jewels for a crown above, Send the light! Send the light!
