= Walter Stillman Martin =

American composer of religious music

Walter Stillman Martin (1862 – 1935), was an American Baptist minister who studied ministry at Harvard University. But he later switched to the denomination of Disciples of Christ. He was married to Civilla Durfee Martin (August 21, 1866 – March 9, 1948), a Canadian-American writer of many religious hymns and gospel songs. In the late 19th century and early 20th century, Martin and his wife together created hymns and songs which have become widely known. Some of her most popular pieces include "God Will Take Care of You", "One of God's Days", "Going Home", "The Old Fashioned Way", and "His Eye Is on the Sparrow".
