= Sparkle (1976 film) =

1976 film

- Theatrical release poster
- Directed by: Sam O'Steen
- Screenplay by: Joel Schumacher; Lonne Elder III; (uncredited)
- Story by: Joel Schumacher; Howard Rosenman
- Produced by: Howard Rosenman
- Starring: Irene Cara; Philip M. Thomas; Lonette McKee; Dwan Smith; Mary Alice; Dorian Harewood; Tony King
- Cinematography: Bruce Surtees
- Edited by: Gordon Scott
- Music by: Curtis Mayfield
- Production company: RSO
- Distributed by: Warner Bros. Pictures
- Release date: April 7, 1976
- Running time: 98 minutes
- Country: United States
- Language: English
- Budget: $1 million
- Box office: $4 million

Sparkle is a 1976 American musical drama film directed by Sam O'Steen and released by Warner Bros. Pictures. With a plot inspired by the history of the Supremes, Sparkle is a period film set in Harlem, New York, during the late 1950s and early 1960s. It presents the story of a musical girl group that ends up breaking apart due to individual issues each member faces. This film not only "recreates the magic of a special period in American history, but it explores the effect of Harlem's musical and social culture on the rest of the world", as well as the linkages to black power.

The film stars Irene Cara, Philip Michael Thomas, Lonette McKee, Dwan Smith, Mary Alice, Dorian Harewood, and Tony King. Curtis Mayfield served as the composer and producer of Sparkle's songs and score.

Although the film received generally negative reviews at the time of release, it was a minor box office success, making $4 million against a $1 million budget. It has since developed a cult following. The film was remade in 2012 starring Jordin Sparks, Carmen Ejogo, Tika Sumpter, and Whitney Houston in her final film role.

== Plot synopsis ==
The movie is a rags to riches story. It begins in Harlem, New York, in 1958, and follows the girl group, Sister and the Sisters, which is made up of three sisters: Sister, Sparkle, and Delores Williams. Stix Warren, Sparkle's love interest and the group's manager, is able to help bring the group from "amateur nights to brief stardom before tragedy (dope, melancholia, the wrong man)" ensues and the group splits. Stix gives up on his music career and leaves the city, thus breaking Sparkle's heart. Sister is in an abusive relationship with Satin Struthers and is on drugs, while Delores leaves the city in pursuit of racial equality. In the end, after reconnecting after Sister's funeral, it seems that only Sparkle and Stix climbed the ladder to success (in the entertainment business), however, we don't know what happened to Delores and her career success.

== Cast ==
- Philip M. Thomas as "Stix" Warren, manager of the girl group, Sparkle's love interest, and an initial member of the group.
- Irene Cara as "Sparkle" Williams, the youngest sister, who becomes the star of the trio and ultimately a solo artist.
- Lonette McKee as Sister Williams, the initial lead singer of the group, who leaves to be with Satin Struthers during her drug addiction.
- Dwan Smith as Delores Williams, the middle sister, who gives up everything in order to find equality and freedom.
- Mary Alice as Effie Williams, mother of the sisters, who encourages Sparkle to pursue her dreams and works as a maid.
- Dorian Harewood as Levi Brown, Stix's cousin with an unrequited crush on Sister, initially was part of the group before he and Stix left; gets imprisoned after he works with Satin.
- Tony King as "Satin" Struthers, Sister's love interest and a woman-beating gangster.
- Beatrice Winde as Mrs. Waters
- Paul Lambert as Max Gerber, Effie's employer, with connections to the Mafia who wants the rights to Sparkle's fame.
- Armelia McQueen as "Tune" Ann, cousin of the Williams' sisters and church choir singer, who serves as a background singer to Sparkle after Sister and Delores depart.
- Joyce Easton as Lee Gerber
- DeWayne Jessie as "Ham", an associate of Satin's
- Norma Miller as Doreen Baker
- Talya Ferro as Miss Taylor
- Bob Delegall as Mr. Daniels
- Don Bexley as "Bubbles" Sweeney
- Ken Renard as Shimmy Dodson
- Robert Hanley as Emcee
- Renn Woods as "Jim Dandy" Singer

== Production ==
=== Development ===
Lonne Elder III, writer of the Academy Award for Best Adapted Screenplay nominee Sounder drafted Sparkle, which Joel Schumacher edited to make a 200-page basis for the film that became his screenwriting debut. John Calley was running Warner Bros. Pictures at the time and said Sam O'Steen had to direct the film. He was the famous editor of Carnal Knowledge, Rosemary's Baby, and Chinatown. This film was Sam O'Steen's debut film as a film director. The film's story and plot were heavily inspired by the women singing groups in the sixties.

=== Casting ===
The film mainly introduced newer faces, which kept the budget low. Over 2,000 women auditioned for the role of Sparkle Williams; in the end, Irene Cara was cast, at age 17. She became the film's breakout star and went on to act in films such as Fame. With her other cast mates Lonette McKee and Dwan Smith, the trio "combine their extraordinary freshness and talent to sing to the music of Curtis Mayfield, who composed the music for the film produced by Howard Rosenman." None of the actors cast were well known at the time and many were newcomers. Lonette McKee actually made her feature film debut in this film.

=== Filming ===
Bruce Surtees was the cinematographer. Lester Wilson choreographed the movie; his assistant was Michael Peters, who went on to choreograph "Beat It" and "Thriller" for Michael Jackson.

== Themes ==
=== Music ===
During the 1960s and 1970s, music paralleled black identity and culture. The early 1960s consisted of freedom music, a direct descendant of gospel music. This genre was aimed at building strong relationships during difficult times by connecting people. Sam Cooke and Freedom Singers are an example of these artists. The late 1960s to early 1970s consisted of soul music which tied in with historical macro events such as: Middle Civil Rights Movement, Great Society, Vietnam War, and Black Power. Soul music encourages everyone to be happy. Some influential artists during this time were James Brown, the Supremes, Aretha Franklin, Marvin Gaye, and Stevie Wonder. Next, the mid-1970s consisted of funk music. These songs were political and group focused. Some of these artists include Earth Wind and Fire, Sly and the Family Stone, Parliament Funkadelic, Kool & The Gang, Labelle, and Chaka Khan. Finally, the middle to late 1970s consisted of disco which was essentially peppy dance music. Stand out artists include Gloria Gaynor, Sister Sledge, Diana Ross, and Donna Summer. Within these genres, there are themes of self-determination, racial pride, and having fun. Sparkle captured all these themes as it spans musical genres and all the songs were adapted to the sound of the times. Aretha Franklin had a large role with the music that was featured in the film and recorded the hit soundtrack album Sparkle. The other songs in the film were written by Curtis Mayfield.

=== Gender and sexuality ===
While analyzing gender and sexuality, the black female protagonists in this film can easily be compared to the women in Cleopatra Jones and Coffy. Unlike these films, however, Sparkle's protagonists do not come out on top in the same way as Cleopatra Jones (Tamara Dobson) and Coffy Coffin (Pam Grier) do.

Compared to Coffy and Cleo, these women are much more conservative in their looks and manner. Regarding female empowerment, their physical appearance is the only major attribute they have, and they use it as a tool and their only weapon. Both Coffy and Cleo had men and actual weapons at their disposal to use alongside their physical appearance. Going off of this, the sisters are much weaker when looking at female empowerment, especially when compared to Coffy and Cleo.

Jacquie Jones' essay, Construction of Black Sexuality, points out how "the Black male character, as defined through his sexual behavior, is not able to overcome the problematic [sic] of domination, which begins with a denial of dependency. Instead, the Black male character can only define himself through violent separateness" (250). One very disturbing scene in the film is when Sister Williams (McKee) and her boyfriend Satin Struthers (Tony King) are lying together on a bed. To keep a coat she hasn't satisfactorily been thankful enough for, Sister is ordered by Satin to crawl. Sister does not think he is serious. Satin begins to punch Sister brutally. When Sister goes to her next performance, her other sisters Sparkle (Cara) and Delores (Smith) realize that she has been beaten (again) by Satin. They encourage her to leave him but she just brushes off the violence as no big deal; she believes she can just cover up the bruises with makeup and all will be better.

Darlene Clark Hine's A Shining Thread of Hope brought up the fact that after women joined the Black Power movements, men felt less of themselves, as they could not protect and support their families as forcefully. Hine states that "the Black Power movement reacted to this reality with an extreme emphasis on masculinity and an expectation that women would assume traditional female roles as a way of supporting black manhood. And yet, women in these organizations actually managed to make greater progress in some ways than they had in more traditional civil rights groups" (298). The reading also addresses 1976 as a time when things started to change in regard to sexual harassment as a crime. This all relates to black women and their position of power. "The terrible reality of their oppression by men of their own color […] was personal and political dynamite" (302). Bringing this all together, Satin might have felt dominated by Sister and her success/potential success. It is unfortunate that Sister decides to brush it off but this goes with how she did not want to "light the fuse" of oppression by black men on black women. Complicating this reasoning is the fact that Satin had previously brutalized a woman ("Taylor") he'd been seeing who posed no enduring threat to his masculinity.

"Blaxploitation films are notable for the ways they frequently situate "normative" black male identity amongst a variety of ideological "others" (women, homosexuals, other ethnicities) whose presence cannot simply be seen to solidify black manhood."

=== Black Power / blaxploitation ===
The 1970s and the Women's Movement provide context for Black films like Sparkle. During this time, Title IX was instated and provided scholarships for female college athletes. In addition, the Equal Rights Amendment of 1972 was a victory for women's suffrage that helped build a dialogue for black women and black women in films.

Drugs, the Mafia, self-determination, and the ghetto are all apparent themes in Sparkle. Black Power in Sparkle is interesting in that there are no positive black male figures in the film. Every man is using women for things like sex, success, and their own selfish reasons. At one point, Jones even addresses black male sexuality and how they assume the role of a white man to achieve power over women. Going off of this, whites in this film are on the periphery and the focus is on the inner struggle between blacks. An example of this is the relationship between Sister and her boyfriend. Satin is an abusive man towards Sister who is involved with drugs and the Mafia. He is the source for all of Sister's struggles as he pushes her into doing drugs and making her feel helpless as he beats her time and time again. Delores is an example of self-determination as she sees her sister Sister struggling, which makes her realize that she needs to leave town and do things for herself. She is strong and independent enough to pick everything up and leave town, striving for a decent future. According to the Senior Vice President of Programming for IFC and Bravo Frances Berwick, "Blaxploitation films were some of the most experimental and daring films to come out of both the independent film scene and the studio system, [and] is one of the most ignored and under-appreciated." Blaxploitation includes several sub-types, musical being one of them, and where Sparkle fits in.

== Reception ==
=== Box office ===
Sparkle was domestically released on April 7, 1976, with a running time of 98 minutes. The film was considered a minor box office hit, earning only $4 million against a $1 million production budget.

=== Critical reception ===
The film received mostly negative reviews from critics. On the review aggregator website Rotten Tomatoes, 18% of 11 critics' reviews are positive, with an average rating of 4.4/10.Variety stated that "somewhere along the line, there was made a decision to cheat—to attempt an honest ghetto drama, but not enough to really go all the way into the characters; to keep the exploitative elements of casual dope and sex, but jump ahead to the convenient tragic results which can be seen on any TV feature; to explore the seedier side of the music business, but not enough to ever get beyond the titillations of pulp storytelling." Richard Eder said the film was a predictable sob story but that the main themes of the story are serious enough and credible. Dave Kehr stated that the film was "[a] hackneyed, ho-hum 1976 feature about a black girl group, clearly modeled on the Supremes." FilmFour stated that "[as] drab as it is, Sparkle's worth renting for Lonette McKee's performance and the cast renditions of Mayfield's songs. But if you're going to buy anything it should be the soundtrack album." Gene Siskel of the Chicago Tribune gave it a mixed two-and-a-half star review, saying that its music was "excellent, but not of the period", that "its social protest theme is 10 years ahead of its time", and that the plot was loaded with clichés, but praising the chemistry between McKee and Cara, and preferring it over that of Diana Ross and Billy Dee Williams in Mahogany from the year before. However, The Onion's A.V. Club gave it a B− grade, calling it "a rags-to-riches story that doesn't miss a stop along the well-trod ghetto-to-musical-charts path, but makes its journey with tuneful conviction."

The Amsterdam News review was mixed: “Sparkle reminds me very much of an uncut diamond not yet perfected for public viewing. Its potentials are boundless, and yet, because of a screenplay by Joel Schumacher that is much too crowded with themes, moods and characters that never fully develop beyond the point of mediocrity, we eventually end up with a highly polished piece of cut glass....The acting is some of the most professional I’ve seen in films that purport an all-Black cast. Lonetta McGee (Sister) has a strong screen presence that is hard to ignore and Irene Cara (Sparkle) portrays the ingenue with more conviction than this film can handle. But this is a small occurrence compared to what the rest of the film has to offer.”

== Legacy ==
Of the people who appeared in the film, Irene Cara became the film's breakout star: she went on to record many chart-topping singles. Lonette McKee went on to other TV and film appearances with Richard Pryor, including playing Malcolm X (Denzel Washington)'s on-screen mother Louise Little in Malcolm X, and Dorian Harewood and Philip Michael Thomas did more TV and film appearances. Thomas would be famous as Ricardo Tubbs on the TV show Miami Vice.

Sparkle was previewed by an appreciative audience in Baltimore in March 1976. The crowd of 1300 is said to have applauded, screamed and displayed loud attestation to their feelings that it was a good movie. It was viewed as a rather atypical Blaxploitation film for the day, illustrating "that based on the nature, dignity, interests and ideals of man even blacks from the ghetto are capable of self-fulfillment and ethical conduct without recourse to supernaturalism; in this case the super-stud, super-chick theory that is so common in the movies made primarily for the black movie goers today."

Sparkle went on to become a cult classic among African-American audiences, and was remade in 2012 as a TriStar Pictures release starring Jordin Sparks and Whitney Houston. Directed by Salim and Mara Brock Akil and produced by Stage 6 Films, the film, despite once again receiving mixed to negative reviews, was considered by some to be an improvement over the original. Sparks, Houston, and Mike Epps were all praised individually for their performances. The remake also brought new different aspects to the story which were said to have enhanced the drama of the film. For example, the evil Satin, played by Epps, was turned into a comedian instead of a gangster. Ultimately, the writing and performances were considered captivating and multidimensional. In regard to the music, R. Kelly wrote several new songs for the soundtrack which were used alongside the songs composed in the original film by Curtis Mayfield.

This film was released later than anticipated, due to the sudden death of Houston. Some have considered the film to have been a huge comeback for Houston in the industry, albeit one achieved posthumously. Irene Cara had met Houston a couple of times. She said, "I remember seeing her mother, Cissy, when I was little, [...] I remember seeing her sing in New York. They were doing a tribute to Burt Bacharach. When Whitney came on to the scene, every time I saw her I saw a little bit of her mother in her." Cara expressed a desire to attend the premiere of the film, but was not able due to a recent foot surgery.

== See also ==
- Sparkle (2012 film)
- Dreamgirls (2006 film), another musical heavily influenced by Diana Ross and the Supremes.
