= Love Potion No. 9 (film) =

1992 film by Dale Launer

- Theatrical release poster
- Directed by: Dale Launer
- Written by: Dale Launer
- Produced by: Dale Launer
- Starring: Tate Donovan; Sandra Bullock; Dale Midkiff
- Cinematography: William Wages
- Edited by: Suzanne Pettit
- Music by: Jed Leiber; Ennio Morricone
- Distributed by: 20th Century Fox
- Release date: November 13, 1992 (United States)
- Running time: 92 minutes
- Country: United States
- Language: English
- Box office: $754,935

Love Potion No. 9 is a 1992 American romantic comedy film starring Tate Donovan and Sandra Bullock. The film takes its name from the 1959 hit song, "Love Potion No. 9". The story is about a love potion, that enables a person to make people of the opposite sex become completely infatuated with them by simply talking.

== Plot ==
Lonely biochemist Paul Matthews has an unrequited crush on his colleague, comparative psychobiologist Diane Farrow. Forlorn, his friends Dave, Jeff, and Ron take Paul to the gypsy, Madame Ruth on 34th and Vine. Reading his palm and seeing absolutely no romance, Ruth dabs a bit of Love Potion No. 8 on paper, providing instructions to dilute and drink it. Paul, doubting its scientific value, throws it away. His friends order Paul a sex worker named Marisa, but they only talk. Diane, self-conscious about her appearance, has her own issues, turning for affection to Gary, a cruel acquaintance of ten years.

Paul's cat licks the potion from the trash and meows, attracting all other neighborhood cats. Observing this, Paul takes it to Diane for analysis. After dosing a female chimp, a male chimp flies into a sexual frenzy upon hearing her. Analysis reveals its "scientific" properties, which cause the imbiber to attract the opposite sex by voice for four hours. They experiment upon themselves, dividing it into spray bottles. She uses hers to prevent a motorcycle cop's citation and insurance cancellation, then attracts Italian car mogul Enrico Pazzoli, who pays for a makeover for a Royal party, attracting Prince Geoffrey of York. Paul uses his to spite Cheryl, who harshly rejected him previously. After hookups in bars, supermarkets, and cars, his sorority house antics gets him arrested. At Diane's home, Gary is told to leave by Prince Geoffrey's security, which confounds Gary.

Later, over time, Paul and Diane become romantically attracted to, and involved with, each other. But when Paul prepares to propose, she inexplicably declares she loves Gary, but tells Paul they can still be friends. Devastated, Paul resolves to win her back, but Gary demands she never see Paul again.

Marisa returns to rob Paul, and uses his spray bottle, causing Paul to willingly hand over his valuables, including Potion #8. After his own infatuation ends, Paul recognizes Diane's "sudden" infatuation with Gary; Madame Ruth confirms it.

After many unsuccessful attempts to convince Diane she's been duped by Gary, Paul returns to Ruth for an antidote. She provides it, explaining, "Love Potion No. 9 does not create emotion, it purifies it" from being "obscured by doubt, prejudice, suspicion." Between those who drink it together, it solidifies true love eternally, five minutes after they share a kiss; the caveat... if Diane never truly loved Paul, he will love her forever but she will eternally hate him.

Paul asks his friends to help force Diane take Potion #9, but they don't believe him. Marisa use #8 to rob them all, but it proves to them its power, and they agree to help. When they arrive at Diane's house, her friend Sally, Diane's matron of honor at her impending wedding to Gary, suspects something is wrong with Diane. Paul explains what is happening and she agrees to help.

They arrive at the church to enact their plan, but things go terribly wrong. Sally successfully gives Diane #9. But before Paul can drink and kiss her, Gary drinks from Diane's glass and kisses her. Madame Ruth tells Paul he too must drink from her glass, and then she must perforce choose between them. But Marisa arrives and enchants Paul's friends, preventing them from restraining Gary. Paul attempts to drink #9 from Diane's glass and kiss her, but Gary throws him out and has him arrested.

Marisa then enchants Gary to get his remaining, undiluted bottle of #8. As Gary is under its effect as well, he enchants Marisa in return. But Gary, having sipped Diane's #9 minutes prior, feels drawn back to Diane and returns to the ceremony to marry her. Marisa, now infatuated with Gary and desperate to get him back, drinks the undiluted #8, enraging all the women in the church, and driving all the men into a stampede, effectively ending the wedding. Marisa flees screaming through the streets, drawing every single man away, which allows Paul to escape police custody.

Paul finally kisses Diane, slugs Gary, and waits five minutes. After six minutes, Diane runs into Paul's arms and they happily leave together. Madam Ruth, observing through her crystal ball, sighs, "Ahh, that's nice."

== Note ==
The film gives a pseudoscientific explanation as to how Love Potion No. 8 "works". It is explained:

When swallowed it affects the vocal cords directly so that when you speak micro-tremors encoded within your voice stimulate tiny little hairs in the inner ear of the opposite sex. The hair vibrates, sending a signal along a nerve to the brain, which in turn produces a combination of mood-altering, endogenous chemicals responsible for the biochemical process of falling in love. It makes members of the same sex hostile. It only works for four hours at a time.

Love Potion No. 9 prevents love from fading, and overrides the effects of Love Potion No. 8.

== Cast ==
- Tate Donovan as Paul Matthews
- Sandra Bullock as Diane Farrow
- Mary Mara as Marisa
- Dale Midkiff as Gary Logan
- Hillary B. Smith as Sally
- Anne Bancroft as Madame Ruth
- Dylan Baker as Prince Geoffrey
- Blake Clark as Motorcycle Cop
- Bruce McCarty as Jeff
- Rebecca Staab as Cheryl
- Adrian Paul as Enrico Pazzoli
- Ric Reitz as Dave
- Steven Burnett as Ron

== Reception ==
On Rotten Tomatoes the film has an approval rating of 25% based on reviews from 12 critics.

Emanuel Levy of Variety called it "a light-hearted one-joke romantic comedy" and that it "tries too hard to be cute. Glib humor and emphasis on "feel good" values aim squarely at the dating crowd and twenty-something couples. But lack of real wit and comic vitality, absence of star names and sluggish pace make pic less appealing than it might have been." Entertainment Weekly gave the film a "D" grade.

The film opened in 278 theaters and earned $416,641 in its opening weekend, and its North American domestic total was $754,935.
