= Tate Donovan =

American actor (born 1963)

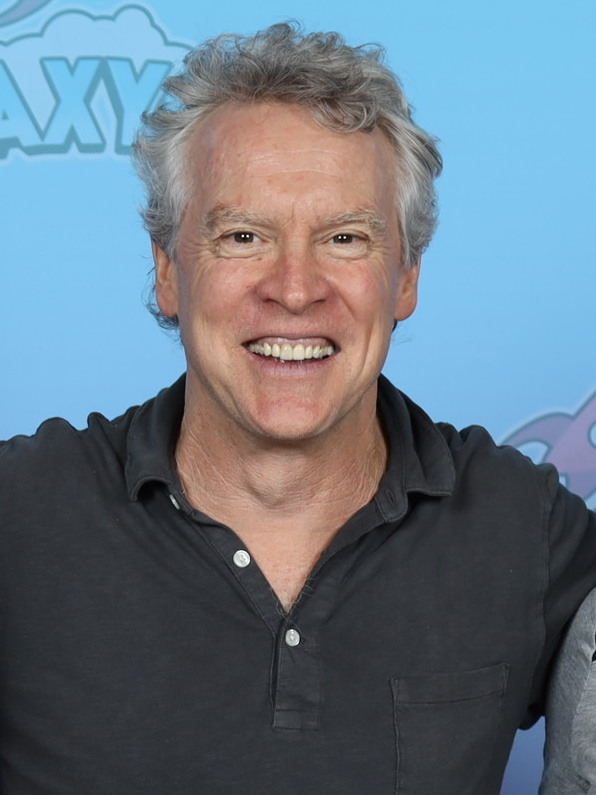
- Donovan in 2023
- Born: Tate Buckley Donovan; September 25, 1963 (age 63); Tenafly, New Jersey, U.S.
- Education: University of Southern California
- Occupations: Actor; comedian; television director
- Years active: 1984–present
- Known for: Hercules; The O.C. Damages; Argo
- Spouse: Corinne Kingsbury (m. 2005; div. 2008) Corry Scheuerman (m. 2015)
- Partner(s): Sandra Bullock (1990–1994); Jennifer Aniston (1995–1998)

Tate Buckley Donovan (born September 25, 1963) is an American actor, comedian and television director. He is known for portraying Tom Shayes in Damages, and Jimmy Cooper in The O.C., as well as providing the voice of the title character in the 1997 Disney animated film Hercules and related projects. He starred opposite Sandra Bullock in the 1992 film Love Potion No. 9.

He also had supporting roles in films such as Good Night, and Good Luck and Argo. Donovan also played Brian Sanders in Hostages and White House Chief of Staff Mark Boudreau in 24: Live Another Day. He has been a guest star in a number of television series, notably Friends portraying the character Joshua Burgin. He was nominated for the Independent Spirit Award for Best Supporting Male for his performance in the film Inside Monkey Zetterland.

Donovan has also worked as a producer of 30 for 30 Shorts, for which he won a Primetime Emmy Award for Outstanding Short Form Nonfiction or Reality Series.

== Early life ==
Donovan was born on September 25, 1963, in Tenafly, New Jersey, to John Timothy Donovan, a surgeon, and Eileen Frances (née McAllister). Both his parents were Roman Catholics of Irish descent. Donovan is the youngest of six children. He attended Dwight-Englewood School in Englewood, New Jersey, before transferring to Tenafly High School and attending the University of Southern California. He has appeared on television since his teenage years.

== Career ==
=== Film ===
Donovan's earliest film roles included Kevin Donaldson in SpaceCamp (1986), recovering drug addict Donald Towle in Clean and Sober (1988), 1st Lieutenant Luke Sinclair in Memphis Belle (1990) and Paul Matthews in Love Potion No. 9 (1992). Donovan voiced the title character in the Disney animated film Hercules (1997). Donovan played Jesse Zousmer in the Best Picture nominated film Good Night, and Good Luck (2005). In 2007, Donovan starred in the film Nancy Drew alongside Emma Roberts. Later, he played Bob Anders, one of the key supporting roles in the Oscar-winning film Argo (2012). In 2019, Donovan portrayed Doug Weston in Rocketman.

=== Television ===
Donovan portrayed Joshua Burgin, the love interest of Rachel Green, for several episodes of Season 4 of Friends. Ironically, he had recently broken up with Jennifer Aniston in real life. He also portrayed 'Cheanie' in 1997, who was a client of and also dated Ally McBeal in season 1 of the show. He later portrayed the priest-son of a large Catholic family in Trinity (1998). He has appeared as a guest star in several television series, such as Magnum, P.I. (1986), The Guardian (2001), Mister Sterling (2003), and Exposed (2003). He was regular on The O.C. (2003), where he appeared as Jimmy Cooper. From 2007 to 2010, he portrayed Tom Shayes on Damages. In 2005, Donovan began directing episodic television when he directed an episode of The O.C.. In 2007 he guest starred on a season 6 episode of Law & Order: Criminal Intent. In 2009, he directed an episode of the sixth season of Medium. He also directed two episodes of Damages in its third season and an episode of Nip/Tuck in its sixth season. In 2010, Donovan directed the third episode in the sixth season of Weeds, the tenth episode in the fourth season of Gossip Girl, the fourth episode of the fifth season, and one episode of Damages from the third season. In 2011, Donovan directed the Valentine's Day-themed episode of Glee and the episode "I Kissed a Girl" in the third season. In March 2010, he joined the cast of No Ordinary Family. However, after only one season, the series was cancelled. Donovan guest appeared in the series, Red Oaks. Starting in 2017, Donovan appeared in CBS's MacGyver as James MacGyver, the titular character's father.

=== Stage ===
Donovan starred on stage with Amy Ryan in the Los Angeles production of Rabbit Hole. On Broadway, he played Alan Seymour in the 1994 Roundabout Theatre Company revival of Picnic and appeared in Amy's View with Judi Dench in 1999. Off Broadway, Donovan appeared with Glenn Fitzgerald in the 2001 production of Lobby Hero by Kenneth Lonergan, playing the role of the crooked cop Bill. Donovan has appeared in numerous productions at the Williamstown Theater Festival, including Once in a Lifetime, Under the Blue Sky, and The Glass Menagerie. He has also appeared at the Irish Repertory Theater in New York City. In 2011, he starred with Frances McDormand in the world premiere of David Lindsay-Abaire's play Good People at the Manhattan Theatre Club.

=== Other work ===
Donovan had a regular gig with traditional Irish band the McGuffins, with whom he released an album titled Wake Amusements. He plays the bodhrán and fiddle.

As of May 2011, Donovan voices radio and video advertising for PNC Financial Services and volunteers with the Young Storytellers Program.

== Personal life ==
Donovan was in a relationship with Sandra Bullock from 1990 to 1994, and Jennifer Aniston for two and a half years from 1995 to 1998. He later married writer Corinne Kingsbury on a Malibu, California beach in 2005. They divorced in 2008. He married Corry Scheuerman in 2015.

Donovan supported Barack Obama in the 2008 and 2012 presidential elections.

== Filmography ==
Key
†	Denotes works that have not yet been released

=== Film ===
Year	Title	Role	Notes
1984	No Small Affair	Bob	
1986	SpaceCamp	Kevin Donaldson	
1988	Clean and Sober	Donald Towle	
1988	Dangerous Curves	Chuck Upton	
1989	Dead Bang	John Burns	
1990	Memphis Belle	1st Lt. Luke Sinclair	
1992	Little Noises	Elliott	
1992	Inside Monkey Zetterland	Brent Zetterland	Nominated – Independent Spirit Award for Best Supporting Male
1992	Equinox	Richie Nunn	
1992	Love Potion No. 9	Paul Matthews	
1993	Ethan Frome	Reverend Smith	
1994	Holy Matrimony	Peter	
1997	The Only Thrill	Eddie	
1997	Murder at 1600	Kyle Neill	
1997	Hercules	Hercules	Voice
1998	The Thin Pink Line	Simon	
1998	October 22	Peter	
1998	Waiting for Woody	David	Short
1999	Hercules: Zero to Hero	Hercules	Video; voice
2000	G-Men from Hell	Mike Mattress	
2001	Swordfish	Senator Reisman's Assistant	Uncredited cameo
2001	Mickey's Magical Christmas: Snowed in at the House of Mouse	Hercules	Video; voice
2003	Exposed	Bob Smith	
2005	The Pacifier	Howard Plummer	
2005	Good Night, and Good Luck	Jesse Zousmer	Nominated – Screen Actors Guild Award for Outstanding Performance by a Cast in a Motion Picture
2006	The Lather Effect	Will	
2007	Shooter	Russ Turner	
2007	Nancy Drew	Carson Drew	
2009	Wild About Harry	Harry Goodhart	
2012	Argo	Bob Anders	Hollywood Film Festival Award for Best Cast; Palm Springs International Film Festival Award for Best Cast; Screen Actors Guild Award for Outstanding Performance by a Cast in a Motion Picture; Nominated – Phoenix Film Critics Society Award for Best Cast
2014	Sun Belt Express	Allen King	
2015	3 Generations	Craig Walker	
2016	Manchester by the Sea	Hockey Coach	
2016	Elvis & Nixon	H. R. Haldeman	
2017	It Happened in L.A.	Tom	
2017	Blame	Robert McCarthy	
2017	The Only Living Boy in New York	George	
2017	The Upside	Carter Locke	
2018	Blood Fest	Dr. Conway	
2018	Grace	Charlie Ellison	
2019	Rocketman	Doug Weston	
2019	The Nomads	Mark Nolin	
2020	Worth	Lee Quinn	
2021	Respect	John Hammond	
2023	Ghosted	Dad	
2023	The Holdovers	Stanley Clotfelter	
2026	Crime 101	Steven Monroe	

=== Television ===
Year	Title	Role	Notes
1984	Family Ties	Clancy	Episode 53: "Best Man"
1985	Not My Kid	Ricky	Television film
1985	Hill Street Blues	Shamrock	Episode: "The Life and Time of Dominic Florio Jr."
1986	Magnum, P.I.	R.J. Masters	Episode: "Summer School"
1986	A Case of Deadly Force	Lawrence O'Donnell Jr.	Television film
1987	Nutcracker: Money, Madness and Murder	Marc Schreuder-Gentile	Miniseries
1988	Vietnam War Story	Russell Sommers	Nominated – CableACE Award for Best Actor in a Miniseries or a Movie
1990	Rising Son	Des	Television film
1994	Tales from the Crypt	Nelson	Episode: "Operation Friendship"
1995–1996	Partners	Owen	22 episodes
1996	America's Dream	David	Television film Segment: "Long Black Song"
1997	Homicide: Life on the Street	Greg Kellerman	Episode: "Wu's on First"
1997	Ally McBeal	Ronald Cheanie	3 episodes
1998	Tempting Fate	Dr. Ben Creed	Television film
1998	Friends	Joshua Burgin	5 episodes
1998	Trinity	Kevin McCallister	3 episodes
1998	Godzilla: The Series	Lawrence Cohen	Voice, episode: "Bird of Paradise"
1998–1999	Hercules	Hercules	Main voice role
2000	The Outer Limits	Tom Seymour	Episode: "Glitch"
2001	Max Steel		Voice, episode: "Spear-Carriers"
2001	House of Mouse	Hercules	Episode: "Jiminy Cricket"
2001	The Legend of Tarzan	Gobu	Voice, episode: Tarzan and the Enemy Within"
2002	The Guardian	Lou Caffey	Episode: "The Innocent"
2003	Mister Sterling	Barry Reed	Television film
2003–2006	The O.C.	Jimmy Cooper	39 episodes
2005	Silver Bells	Chris Byrne	Television film
2005	Painkiller Jane	Dr. Graham Knight / Lucas Insley	Television film
2007	Law & Order: Criminal Intent	Commander Luke Nelson	Episode: "Rocket Man"
2007–2010	Damages	Tom Shayes	36 episodes
2008	The Cleaner	Richard Hoffler	Episode: "Meet the Joneses"
2009	Head Case	Himself	Episode: "Tying the Not"
2010	No Ordinary Family	Mitch McCutcheon	Episode: "Pilot"
2013	Deception	Edward Bowers	11 episodes
2013–2014	Hostages	Brian Sanders	15 episodes
2014	24: Live Another Day	Mark Boudreau	12 episodes
2015	Masters of Sex	Graham	Episode: "Undue Influence"
2015	Red Oaks	Martin van Diem	Episode: "Doubles
2016	Elementary	Wilson Trager	Episode: "Alma Matters"
2016	Limitless	John	Episode: "Fundamentals of Naked Portraiture"
2016	The Mysteries of Laura	Detective Malcolm Harris	Episode: "The Mystery of the Unknown Caller"
2016	The Man in the High Castle	George Dixon	Season 2 (recurring role)
2017	Law & Order: Special Victims Unit	Eli Colton	Episode: "Net Worth"
2018–2020	MacGyver	James MacGyver / OVERSIGHT	12 episodes
2019	Love You to Death	Travis Stoller	Television film
2019	Alternatino with Arturo Castro	Unknown	Episode: "The Neighbor"
2023	FBI	Jake Reed	Episode: "Second Life"
2024	Blue Bloods	Terry Friendly	Episode: "Bad Faith"

Television director
Year	Title	Role
2005	The O.C.	Episode: "The Game Plan"
2009	Medium	Episode: "Pain Killer"
2009–2010	Nip/Tuck	2 episodes
2009–2013	Damages	5 episodes
2010	Weeds	Episode: "A Yippity Sippity"
2010	The Good Guys	Episode: "Old Dogs"
2010–2011	Gossip Girl	2 episodes
2011	Glee	2 episodes
2013	Deception	Episode: "Tell Me"
2015	Bloodline	Episode: "Part 7"
2015	Madam Secretary	2 episodes
2017	The Fosters	Episode: "Too Fast, Too Furious"
2020	Hawaii Five-0	Episode: "Nalowale i ke 'ehu o he kai"

Video games
Year	Title	Voice role
1997	Hercules	Hercules
2006	Kingdom Hearts II	Hercules
2010	Kingdom Hearts Re:coded	Hercules
2014	Kingdom Hearts HD 2.5 Remix	Hercules
2019	Kingdom Hearts III	Hercules
2023	Disney Speedstorm	Hercules

== Stage ==
Theatre credits
Year	Title	Role(s)	Venue	Refs.
1990	The American Plan	performer	Manhattan Theatre Club, Off-Broadway	
1990	Opposite Versions of Inversions	In The Ruffian on the Stair: Wilson In The Lover: John	Long Wharf Theater, Connecticut	
1998	The Glass Menagerie	Jim O'Connor	Williamstown Theatre Festival, Massachusetts	
1999	Amy's View	Dominic Tyghe	Barrymore Theatre, Broadway	
2001	Lobby Hero	Bill	Playwrights Horizons, Off-Broadway	
2002	Under the Blue Sky	Nick	Williamstown Theatre Festival, Massachusetts	
2002	Once in a Lifetime	Jerry Hyland	Williamstown Theatre Festival, Massachusetts	
2006	Rabbit Hole	Howie	Geffen Playhouse, Los Angeles	
2011	Good People	Mike Dillon	Samuel J. Friedman Theatre, Broadway	
2011	Lobby Hero	Bill	L.A. Theatre Works	
2012	Medieval Play	Sir Alfred	Signature Theatre Company, Off-Broadway	
