= Charles H. Gabriel =

American composer and lyricist

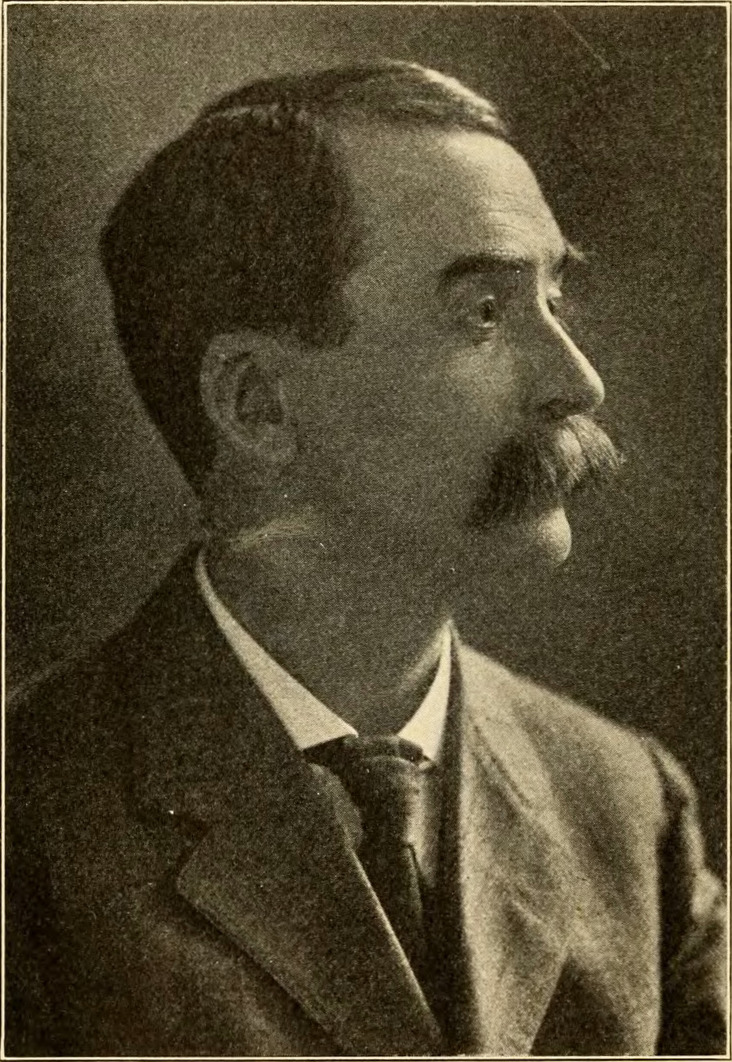
- Born: August 18, 1856; Wilton, Muscatine, Iowa, US
- Died: September 14, 1932 (aged 76); Hollywood, California, US
- Occupations: Composer, lyricist
- Awards: Inductee into Gospel Music Hall of Fame (1982)

Charles Hutchinson Gabriel (August 18, 1856 – September 14, 1932) was an American composer and lyricist of gospel songs and gospel tunes. He is said to have written or composed between 7,000 and 8,000 songs, many of which are available in 21st century hymnals. He used several pseudonyms, including Charlotte G. Homer, H. A. Henry, and S. B. Jackson.

== Biography ==
Charles Hutchinson Gabriel was born in Wilton, Muscatine County, Iowa on August 18, 1856, and raised on a farm. His father led singing schools in their home, and young Charles developed an interest in music. It is said that he taught himself to play the family's reed organ. Even though he never had any formal training in music, he began to travel and lead his own shape note singing schools in various locations around age 17.

His musical talent was well recognized in his boyhood home of Wilton. There is one folklore story, that the pastor of the First Presbyterian Church of Wilton (Pastor Pollock or McAulay) once saw Gabriel walking in town early in the week. He asked Gabriel if he knew a good song to go along with his sermon. The pastor shared the sermon topic and by the end of the week the boy had written the words and music of a song for that Sunday. The Rev. N. A. McAulay was a pastor at the Wilton church for many years, and it is also said that young Gabriel wrote the music for one of McAulay's songs. The song, "How Could it Be", was later published in Songs for Service, edited by Gabriel, with the music being credited to "Charles H. Marsh", possibly one of Gabriel's pseudonyms.

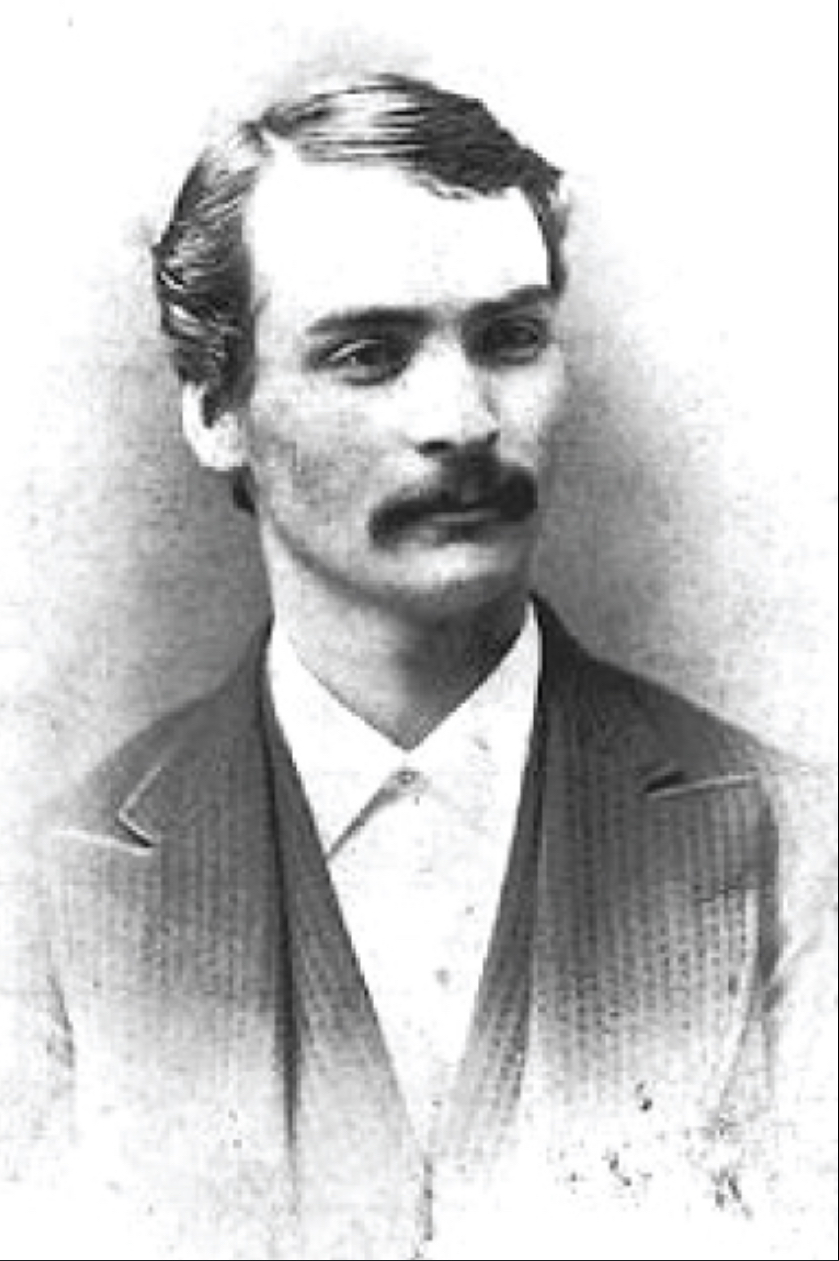
Gabriel c. 1885

Eventually he served as music director at Grace Methodist Episcopal Church, San Francisco, California (1890–2). He wrote "Send the Light"—his first commercial song—for a mission celebration at the church. He moved to Chicago, Illinois, and in 1912 he began working with Homer Rodeheaver's publishing company.

== Personal life ==
Gabriel was married twice, first to Fannie Woodhouse, which ended in divorce, and later to Amelia Moore. One child was born to each marriage.

He died in Hollywood, California on September 14, 1932, aged 76. Gabriel wrote his autobiography: Sixty Years of Gospel Song.

== Legacy ==
He was inducted into the Gospel Music Hall of Fame in 1982.

== Songs ==
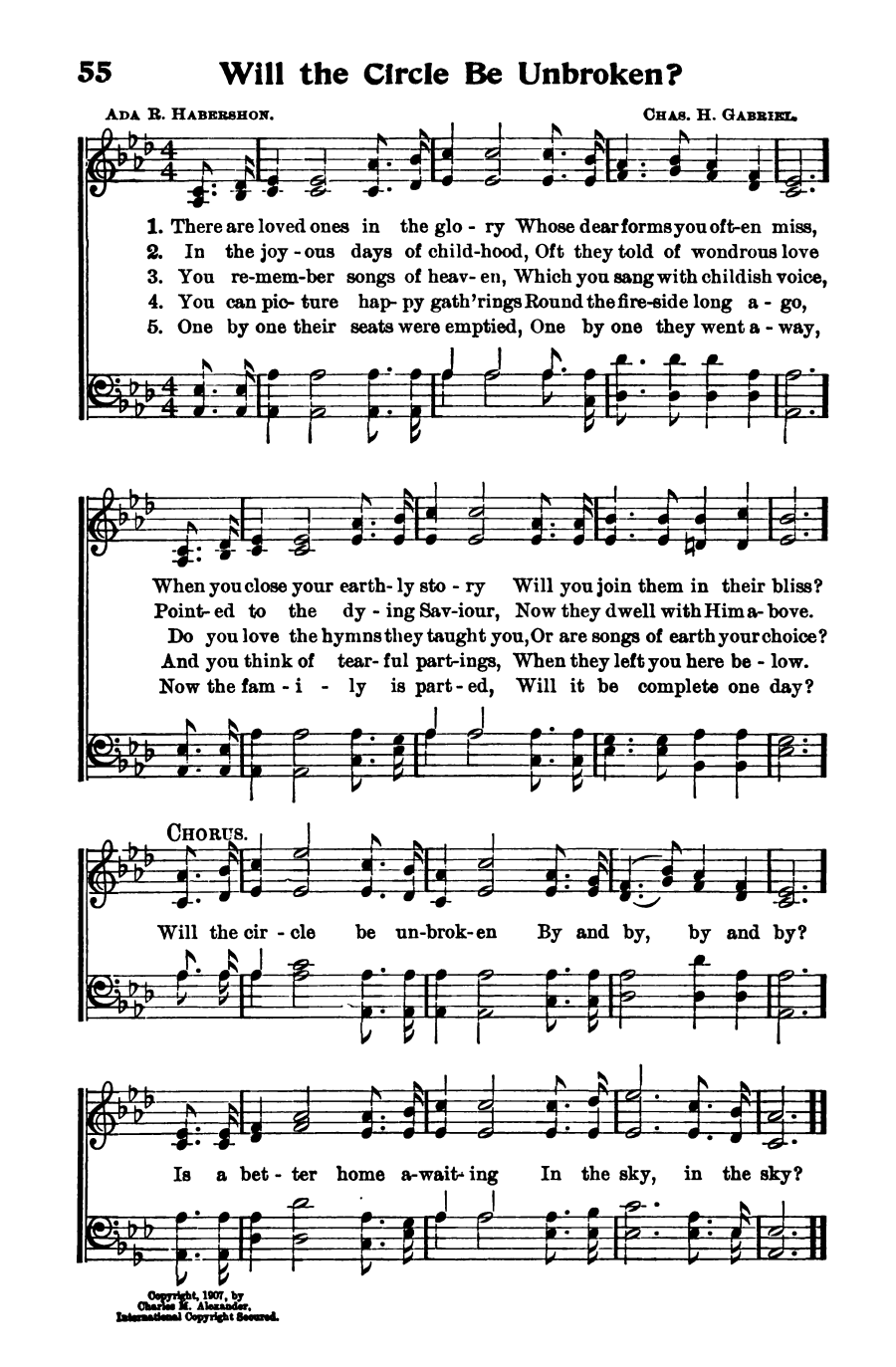
Will the Circle Be Unbroken

=== General ===
Gabriel edited 35 gospel song books, 8 Sunday school song books, 7 books for male choruses, 6 books for ladies, 10 children's song books, 19 collections of anthems, 23 choir cantatas, 41 Christmas cantatas, 10 children's cantatas, and books on musical instruction.

Among these publications are: Gospel Songs and Their Writers (Chicago, Illinois: The Rodeheaver Company, 1915) The Singers and Their Songs (Chicago, Illinois: The Rodeheaver Company, 1916) Church Music of Yesterday, To-Day and for To-Morrow (Chicago, Illinois: The Rodeheaver Company, 1921) Golden Bells (Chicago, Illinois: The Rodeheaver Company, 1923) (music editor) His "Dream of Fairyland" was an exceedingly successful children's cantata, and sold well for several years. He considered his best work to be a sacred cantata for adult voices: "Saul, King of Israel." He also had an interest in military bands, and wrote marches, waltzes, etc., for bands.

=== Gospel songs and hymns ===
"Gospel songs" are not necessarily published in the main hymnals used in denominational worship, they are typically found in evangelical Protestantism and are less prevalent in more liturgical churches, but Diehl's index to denominational hymnals published from the 1890s to 1966 lists 37 tunes by Gabriel.

As a sample of Gabriel's vast output, below are the Gabriel tunes from three songbooks and two denominational hymnals. This list omits tunes attributed to names that are possible Gabriel pseudonyms but includes lyrics published by Gabriel under a known pseudonym. Note that none of these sources published one of Gabriel's most popular songs, "Brighten the Corner Where You Are" (1913).

The song books referenced in the table are as follows:

- (A) Alexander, Charles M. (ed.) Alexander's Gospel Songs. Philadelphia: Westminster Press, 1908
- (R) Rodeheaver, Homer and B. D. Ackley, eds. Great Revival Hymns. Chicago: Rodeheaver-Ackley Co., 1911.
- (C) Bowen, C. A. (ed.) The Cokesbury Worship Hymnal. Nashville: Abingdon-Cokesbury Press, 1938.
- (B) Sims, Walter Hines. Baptist Hymnal. Nashville: Convention Press, 1956.
- (L) Church of Jesus Christ of Latter-day Saints. Hymns of The Church of Jesus Christ of Latter-day Saints. Salt Lake City: Intellectual Reserve, Inc., 1985.
- (L2) Church of Jesus Christ of Latter-day Saints. Hymns—For Home and Church. Salt Lake City: Intellectual Reserve, Inc., 2025.

Title	Date	Lyrics	Hymnal numbers	Comment
"Send the Light"	no date	Gabriel	#457 (B)	His first widely sung work
"Homeward"	no date	Ada Powell	#168 (R)	Choral
"Calling the Prodigal"	1889	Gabriel	#66 (R)	
"I Will Not Forget Thee"	1889	Gabriel	#65 (R) #278 (B)	
"There is Glory in My Soul"	1894	Grace Weiser Davis	#27 (R)	
"Let the Sunshine In"	1895	Ada Blenkhorn	#147 (R)	Children's song
"O Sacred Head"	1895	Paul Gerhardt	#179 (R)	Choral arrangement of a classic
"Be a Hero"	1897	Adam Craig	#148 (R)	Children's song
"Higher Ground"	1898	Johnson Oatman, Jr.	#303 (R) #127 (C) #319 (B)	Also known by first line "I'm pressing on"
"Oh It Is Wonderful"	1898	Gabriel	#193 (L)	Also known by the first line "I Stand All Amazed"
"The Silly Little Duck"	1898	Ida M. Budd	#158 (R)	Children's song
"Dear Little Stranger"	1900	Gabriel	#143 (R)	Children's song, Christmas
"O That Will Be Glory"	1900	Gabriel	#130 (C) #485 (B) #41 (R)	"The Glory Song"
"Because I Love Jesus"	1902	James Rowe	#20 (R)	
"He is So Precious to Me"	1902	Gabriel	#79 (R) #304 (B)	
"The Lord Knows Why"	1902	Johnson Oatman, Jr.	#111 (R)	
"Sunshine and Rain"	1902	Gabriel	#149 (R)	Children's song
"Help Somebody Today"	1904	Mrs. Frank A. Breck	#13 (R) #67 (C)	
"There is Glory in My Soul"	1904	Grace Weiser Davis	#239 (C)	
"Awakening Chorus"	1905	Charlotte G. Homer	#271 (C)	Here written as by one of Gabriel's pseudonyms
"He Lifted Me"	1905	Charlotte G. Homer, pseudonym Gabriel	#192 (C) #28 (A)	Also known by first line "In loving-kindness Jesus came"
"I Stand Amazed"	1905	Gabriel	#1 (A) #139 (B) #193 (L)	See also "My Savior's Love" infra
"My Savior's Love"	1905	Gabriel	#163 (C)	Also known by first line "I stand amazed"
"What a Saviour!"	1905	Charlotte G. Homer	#16 (A)	Here written as by one of Gabriel's pseudonyms
"Because He Loved His Own"	1906	Civilla Durfee Martin	#56 (R)	
"His Eye Is on the Sparrow"	1906	Civilla Durfee Martin	#231 (C) #29 (A) #1005 (L2)	
"Little Evangels"	1906	Ida L. Reed	#145 (R)	Children's song
"More Like the Master"	1906	Gabriel	#120 (R) #60 (C) #325 (B)	
"The Way of the Cross Leads Home"	1906	Jessie Brown Pounds	#141 (C) #196 (B)	Also known by first line "I must needs go home"
"As a Volunteer"	1907	W. S. Brown	#36 (R)	
"God Knows Thy Need"	1907	"A. N."	#8 (A)	
"Growing Dearer Each Day"	1907	Gabriel	#24 (R)	
"Harvest-Time is Here"	1907	Gabriel	#177 (R)	Choral
"Kept Through Faith"	1907	Civilla Durfee Martin	#93 (A)	
"Let Us Be Lights"	1907	Maggie E. Gregory	#95 (A)	
"Now"	1907	Ada Ruth Habershon	#36 (A)	
"Onward, Forward"	1907	Charlotte G. Homer	#89 (A)	Here written as by one of Gabriel's pseudonyms
"A Sinner Made Whole"	1907	W. M. Lighthall	#8 (R)	
"A Song of Victory"	1907	Charlotte G. Homer	#175 (R)	Here written as by one of Gabriel's pseudonyms; Choral
"The Way of the Cross Leads Home"	1907	Jessie Brown Pounds	#11 (R)	See also 1906 listing supra
"Will the Circle Be Unbroken?"	1907	Ada Ruth Habershon	#55 (A)	
"Just When I Need Him Most"	1908	William Pool	#16 (R) #175 (C) #267 (B)	
"The Slighted Stranger"	1908	Gabriel	#88 (R)	
"White Harvest-Fields"	1908	Eleanor W. Long	#110 (R)	
"Whom, Having Not Seen, I Love"	1908	Maud Frazer	#28 (R)	
"It is Jesus"	1909	Thomas O. Chisholm	#126 (R)	
"Sail On"	1909	Gabriel	#17 (R)	
"Thy Kingdom Come"	1909	C. McKibbin	#3 (R)	
"All Hail, Immanuel!"	1910	D. R. van Sickle	#181 (R) #272 (C)	choral
"Crown Him With Many Crowns"	1910	Matthew Bridges	#172 (R)	Choral, not the well known tune
"In Loving-Kindness Jesus Came"	1910	Gabriel	#202 (B)	See also "He Lifted Me" supra
"My Father Watches Over Me"	1910	William Clark Martin	#86 (R)	
"Singing All the Time"	1910	D. R. van Sickle	#140 (R)	
"Wonderful Love of Jesus"	1910	Gabriel	#35 (R)	Also known by first line "In vain in high and holy lays"
"An Evening Prayer"	1911	C. M. Battersby	#120 (C)	Also known by first line "If I have wounded any soul today"
"The Great Campaign"	1911	Gabriel	#174 (R)	Choral
"Send the Power Again"	1911	W. C. Poole	#70 (R)	
"They Didn't Think"	1911	Phoebe Cary	#156 (R)	children's song
"Pentecostal Power"	1912	Charlotte G. Homer	#243 (C) #173 (B)	Here written as by one of Gabriel's pseudonyms
"Since Jesus Came Into My Heart"	1914	R. H. McDaniel	#84 (C) #310 (B)	
"I Need Jesus"	1924	George O. Webster	#125 (C)	

== Sources ==
- Terry York, "Charles Hutchinson Gabriel: Composer, Author, and Editor in the Gospel Tradition" (Unpublished DMA diss., New Orleans Baptist Theological Seminary, 1985).
- Kevin Mungons and Douglas Yeo, Homer Rodeheaver and the Rise of the Gospel Music Industry (Urbana: University of Illinois Press, 2021).
