= The Underdoggs =

2024 film by Charles Stone III

- Release poster
- Directed by: Charles Stone III
- Written by: Danny Segal; Isaac Schamis
- Produced by: Kenya Barris; Snoop Dogg; Constance Schwartz-Morini; Mychelle Deschamps; Jonathan Glickman
- Starring: Snoop Dogg; Tika Sumpter; Andrew Schulz; Mike Epps; Kal Penn; Kandi Burruss; George Lopez
- Cinematography: Mitchell Amundsen
- Edited by: Paul Millspaugh
- Music by: Joseph Shirley
- Production companies: Khalabo Ink Society; Death Row Pictures; SMAC Productions; Panoramic Media Company
- Distributed by: Amazon MGM Studios
- Release date: January 26, 2024
- Running time: 96 minutes
- Country: United States
- Language: English
- Budget: $30 million

The Underdoggs is a 2024 American sports comedy film directed by Charles Stone III and written by Danny Segal and Isaac Schamis. The film stars Snoop Dogg, Tika Sumpter, Andrew Schulz, Mike Epps, Kal Penn, Kandi Burruss and George Lopez.

The Underdoggs was released by Amazon MGM Studios as a Prime Video exclusive on January 26, 2024.

== Plot ==
Jaycen "Two-J's" Jennings is an arrogant washed up former football superstar. After a major car accident, Jaycen is ordered to perform community service in his old neighborhood. He sees an opportunity to rebuild his brand by coaching a struggling youth football team, where one of the players is the son of his former flame Cherise. Despite being rough on the kids at first, Jaycen finds a way to connect with them and help inspire them to do better.

Jaycen sees an opportunity for a comeback by having his own sports show, but the first taping is on the day of the team's big game. Despite trying to revive his career, Jaycen chooses to be with the team. They almost win until one of the players misses the line to make the touchdown, causing the other team to win, but everyone still remains inspired by the underdog team, and Jaycen appears to get back with Cherise.

== Cast ==
- Snoop Dogg as Jaycen, a football coach
  - Snoop Dogg also plays the narrator.
  - Elias Ferguson as young Jaycen
- Tika Sumpter as Cherise
- Jonigan Booth as Trey
- Caleb Dixon as Dwayne
- Adan James Carrillo as Tony
- Alexander Michael Gordon as Gary
- Kylah Davila as Ghost
- Mike Epps as Kareem, Jaycen’s best friend
- George Lopez as Coach Feis
- Shamori Washington as Bale
- Schelle Purcell as Esa
- Andrew Schulz as Chip Collins, Jaycen’s nemesis and former friend
- Kal Penn as Ryan Kauffman
- Kandi Burruss as Judge Tara

== Production ==
The idea for the film was pitched by Snoop Dogg and Constance Schwartz-Morini. On August 2, 2022, it was announced that Snoop Dogg would star in and produce the film, to be directed by Charles Stone III, with the screenplay by Danny Segal and Isaac Schamis, produced by Schwartz-Morini, Kenya Barris, Mychelle Deschamps, and Jonathan Glickman. On October 4, 2022, it was announced that Tika Sumpter, Mike Epps, Andrew Schulz, and George Lopez had joined the cast, alongside child actors Jonigan Booth, Adam James Carrillo, Kylah Davila, Caleb Dixon, Alexander Michael Gordon, and Shamori Washington.

Principal photography began in Atlanta, Georgia on September 26, 2022, and filmed for seven weeks.

== Release ==
The Underdoggs was originally set to be released in theaters on October 20, 2023, but the release date was later changed to January 26, 2024. In December 2023, it was announced that the film would skip theaters and be released straight to Amazon Prime Video on that date in response to a decline in R-rated comedy films faring well at the box office during that summer.

== Reception ==
On the review aggregator website Rotten Tomatoes, 42% of 50 critics' reviews are positive, with an average rating of 4.4/10. The website's consensus reads: "Snoop Dogg remains an appealing screen presence and The Underdoggs offers its share of laughs, but this crass youth sports comedy isn't doing anything audiences haven't seen done better before." Metacritic, which uses a weighted average, assigned the film a score of 39 out of 100, based on nine critics, indicating "generally unfavorable" reviews.
