= Glory Song =

"O That Will Be Glory", also known as "The Glory Song", with words and music by Charles H. Gabriel (1856-1932), was first published in 1900. In 1914, J. H. Hall claimed that the song had been translated into at least 17 languages and that at least 17 million copies of the song were then in print. From 1930 to 1965, "O That Will Be Glory" was the theme song of evangelist G. E. Lowman's international radio broadcast. The musical score of the song can be found online in Excell's Praises (song number 4).

== Words ==
1. When all my labors and trials are o’er,

And I am safe on that beautiful shore,
Just to be near the dear Lord I adore
Will thro’ the ages be glory for me.

Chorus:

O that will be glory for me
Glory for me,
Glory for me;
When by His grace I shall look on His face,
That will be glory,
Be glory for me.

2. When by the gift of His infinite grace,

I am accorded in heaven a place,
Just to be there and to look on His face,
Will thro’ the ages be glory for me.

3. Friends will be there I have loved long ago;

Joy like a river around me will flow;
Yet, just a smile from my Savior, I know,
Will thro’ the ages be glory for me.

== Background ==
During the early summer of 1900, while bicycle riding with a Chicago publisher [probably E. O. Excell], for whom he was at the time preparing manuscript, he said to his friend: “I’ve got a song that is going to live!” He then gave the title of, and made brief quotations from, “O that will be glory.” He was paid $10. for the song.

The inspiration for the song is said to have been a man named Ed Card, superintendent of the Sunshine Rescue Mission in St. Louis, MO. During worship services at the mission, Card would frequently exclaim, “Glory!” and he became known as “Old Glory Face.”

Charles M. Alexander had a great deal to do with popularizing the song, even though his first impression of the song was negative. He wrote that when he first saw it in publication, he said to himself, “That man has wasted a page, for I do not believe that song will be sung much,” but several months later he heard it being sung at a Sunday school convention, and was impressed by the enthusiasm with which the crowd sang it. Alexander wrote, “It took such a hold of me that I could think of nothing else for days thereafter. I got my friends to sing it. I dreamed about it, and woke to the rhythm of it. Then I began to teach it to large audiences, and soon whole towns were ringing with the melody.”

Alexander also saw college students in Kansas singing the song as they paraded in the streets, and about 800 people coming to a revival on a chartered train singing the song at the station.

Shortly after that, Alexander teamed with R. A. Torrey for an evangelistic campaign in Melbourne, Australia, and printed several thousand copies of the song for use there. “The next day, all over the city inquiries were made for the ‘Glory Song.’” He went from Melbourne to Sydney, where the song was equally popular. Alexander later took the song to Great Britain.

It has been translated into many languages.

== Controversy ==
Theological critics have complained that this song focuses too much on the heavenly reward the singer expects to receive, rather than on gratitude toward God or on a Christian’s duty in response to God.

Patrick and Sydnor, who do not like “gospel” music and attribute its “low quality” to the pressures of commercial success, comment: “It is difficult to say just where the lowest depth [of gospel song quality] was touched, but probably the so-called ‘Glory Song,’ with its recurring refrain of ‘That will be glory, be glory for me!’ [italics provided by Patrick and Sydnor] reached the ultimate nadir of unevangelical egotism.”

The Billy Graham Evangelistic Association has recognized the validity of this criticism, and Graham’s song leader, Cliff Barrows has responded, saying that the song must be properly understood within the wider context of Christian theology:

No doubt many Christians have a false view of what heaven will be. Our critics often say that we yearn for “pie in the sky by and by,” while failing to really confront the issues that face us here and now. It is true that heaven will be free of sorrow and death, the pressures and conflicts which beset us on earth. But it is not a truly Christian motive to look for heaven simply because we will have no problems there. . . .

What this “Glory Song” really says is that the central attraction in heaven will be Jesus Christ. We will see Him then “in His completeness, face to face,” not “as if we were peering at His reflection in a poor mirror” (I Cor 13:12, LL). And all the changes that will take place in us will happen because “when He comes we will be like Him, as a result of seeing Him as He really is” (I John 3:2, LL).
