= Sparkle (2012 film) =

2012 film by Salim Akil

- Theatrical release poster
- Directed by: Salim Akil
- Screenplay by: Mara Brock Akil
- Story by: Joel Schumacher; Howard Rosenman
- Based on: Sparkle; 1976 film by Joel Schumacher and Howard Rosenman
- Produced by: Debra Martin Chase; Whitney Houston; TD Jakes; Curtis Wallace; Salim Akil; Mara Brock Akil
- Starring: Jordin Sparks; Whitney Houston; Derek Luke; Mike Epps; Carmen Ejogo; Tika Sumpter; Omari Hardwick; CeeLo Green
- Cinematography: Anastas N. Michos
- Edited by: Terilyn A. Shropshire
- Music by: Salaam Remi; R. Kelly; Curtis Mayfield; Kier Lehman; André DeJuan
- Production companies: Stage 6 Films; TriStar Pictures; Martin Chase Productions; Akil Productions
- Distributed by: Sony Pictures Releasing
- Release date: August 17, 2012
- Running time: 116 minutes
- Country: United States
- Language: English
- Budget: $14 million
- Box office: $24.7 million

Sparkle is a 2012 American musical film directed by Salim Akil and produced by Stage 6 Films. It was released on August 17, 2012, by TriStar Pictures. Inspired by The Supremes, Sparkle is a remake of the 1976 film of the same title, which centered on three singing teenage sisters who form a girl group in the late 1950s. The remake takes place in Detroit, Michigan, in 1968 during the Motown era.

The film stars Jordin Sparks in her film debut, Whitney Houston, Derek Luke, Cee Lo Green, Mike Epps, Carmen Ejogo, Tika Sumpter, Tamela Mann, and Omari Hardwick. Sparkle features songs from the original film written by soul musician Curtis Mayfield as well as new compositions by R&B artist R. Kelly. This film is the debut of R&B/pop singer and American Idol winner Jordin Sparks as an actress. Sparkle also marks Houston's final feature film role before her death on February 11, 2012, three months after filming ended. The film is dedicated to her memory.

== Plot ==
In 1968 Detroit, aspiring record label executive Stix approaches the Anderson sisters – eldest Tammy aka "Sister", middle child Delores aka "Dee", and Sparkle, the youngest – to form a girl group after he sees Sister perform a song that Sparkle wrote at a nightclub. The girls are raised by their mother Emma, who disapproves of them singing outside of church.

Dee agrees to join the group, reasoning she will perform until she has earned enough money to pay for medical school. Though Sister is initially undecided, Sparkle convinces her that if they win a local talent show, she could use the prize money to finally move out of Emma's home. Stix becomes romantically involved with Sparkle, and his cousin Levi also becomes involved with Sister.

With Stix as their manager, the girls enter the talent show and wow the crowd with their performance of a song. (Note: "Hooked on Your Love".) The sisters become a popular act and are invited to perform at clubs throughout Detroit. Sister gains the attention of comedian Satin Struthers, for whom she dumps Levi.

When a newly engaged Sister brings Satin over for a family dinner, an argument erupts after Satin makes insulting remarks and Emma makes her dislike for him known to everyone at the table. In response, Sister lashes out at Emma, criticizing her for having her as a teen, which left Sister to raise her sisters as Emma was out drinking and trying to pursue a music career. Sister leaves with Satin and Emma banishes her from returning home.

As the girls' fame continues to rise, Sister's relationship with Satin becomes physically abusive, to the point that she spirals into drug abuse. This becomes apparent to Dee and Sparkle when, in preparation to open for Aretha Franklin on a television show, Sister walks into the dressing room with a black eye and bruises. The girls manage to perform a song. (Note: "Something He Can Feel".) Emma catches a glimpse of their performance on television but is resentful that her daughters have gone against her wishes to pursue singing.

Stix introduces the girls to Columbia Records executive Larry Robinson, who offers to sign them as a group. Dee and Sparkle try to get Sister to leave Satin and come back home with them, but are unsuccessful. At home, Sparkle's relationship with Emma becomes increasingly strained as she is pressured into abandoning her love of singing.

A meeting with Columbia is derailed when Dee and Sparkle find Sister in a back room looking for a cocaine fix. At Satin and Sister's home, Dee and Sparkle plead for Sister to leave and get help for her drug problem. When Satin shows up and punches Sparkle, the girls fight him. Satin is struck by Dee with a fireplace poker and falls unconscious. Though Dee tries to administer CPR, they realize he is dead. Sister orders Sparkle and Dee to leave the house and accepts blame when police arrive.

Hearing that Sister has been arrested and charged with manslaughter, Emma leads her church choir in the performance of a song. (Note: "His Eye is on the Sparrow".) She arrives home to find Dee packing up to leave, with her revealing she was accepted to Meharry Medical College and must enroll promptly to receive her scholarship money. Emma proudly hugs Dee before she departs.

Sparkle visits Sister in prison, confiding she turned down a marriage proposal from Stix and broke up with him. Later, Sparkle moves out of Emma's home and rents her own apartment. She secures a meeting with Larry at Columbia and convinces him to give her a shot at a solo career, on the condition that she first put on a musical showcase. Sparkle reaches out to Stix to help her set up the showcase, and the couple eventually rekindle their relationship. Sparkle also extends an invitation to her mother to see the show, but Emma seems uninterested.

Emma visits Sister in prison and the two reconcile. While getting ready for her showcase, Sparkle suffers a nose bleed in the dressing room, ruining her dress. To Sparkle's surprise, Emma walks in with a new dress for her and expresses pride in Sparkle for following her dreams.

Sparkle goes on stage and performs a song which she dedicates to Sister. (Note: "One Wing".) A proud Emma watches in the audience while Stix and Larry watch from the side. Larry informs Stix that he wants to sign Sparkle.

== Cast ==
- Jordin Sparks as Sparkle Anderson
- Whitney Houston as Emma Anderson, the girls' strict mother. Emma is a failed entertainer and born-again church lady.
- Derek Luke as Stix
- Carmen Ejogo as Tammy (Sister) Anderson. The eldest sister, a divorcée who returns home to her mother and sisters.
- Tika Sumpter as Delores (Dee) Anderson. The middle sister, who is politically outspoken and is accepted into Meharry Medical College.
- Mike Epps as Satin Struthers. Satin is a self-hating stand-up comedian, who earns money off making black people the butt of his jokes.
- Omari Hardwick as Levi
- Cee Lo Green as Black
- Curtis Armstrong as Larry Robinson
- Terrence J as Red
- Tamela Mann as Ms. Sara Waters, Emma's best friend
- Brely Evans as Tune Ann Waters
- Michael Beach as Reverend Bryce
- Kem L. Owens as Buddy
- Goapele as girl group Lead singer
- Fatima Robinson, Keely Morris as girl group backup singers
- Brittany Perry Russell and Charmaine Jordan as Sparkle's backup singers

== Production ==
=== Development ===
The original Sparkle, produced by The Robert Stigwood Organization in 1975 and released by Warner Bros. Pictures in 1976, starred Philip Michael Thomas, Irene Cara, Lonette McKee and Mary Alice, with songs and score composed and produced by Curtis Mayfield. One song from the Sparkle soundtrack, "Something He Can Feel", became a hit single for both Aretha Franklin (in 1976) and En Vogue (in 1992).

Howard Rosenman, an original producer and writer on the 1976 film, said Whitney Houston was influenced by the original movie as a girl and once went to see it every day for a week when she was a teenager, inspiring her to become a singer. In the mid-1990s, BrownHouse Productions, run by Whitney Houston and Debra Martin Chase, secured the rights to a Sparkle remake from Warner Bros. When the remake was put into development, Rosenman approached Houston to play the role of Emma. Rosenman also served as an executive producer for the remake.

Houston had cast R&B singer Aaliyah in the lead role as Sparkle, but due to Aaliyah's untimely death in an August 2001 plane crash at the age of 22, the film's production plans were put on hold. Over the years, multiple actresses and singers, including Raven-Symoné and Ashanti, were also considered for the lead role. Following the 2011 release of their first feature, Jumping the Broom, Salim Akil and Mara Brock Akil, the creative team behind the TV series The Game and Girlfriends, took on Sparkle as their next project, with Houston executive producing and starring as the mother of the three girls.

=== Filming ===
Production for the film began in October 2011 in Detroit and wrapped mid-November.

The official trailer for Sparkle premiered on Today on April 2, 2012. With the release of the trailer, producer Debra Martin Chase said she had mixed emotions, commenting, "On the one hand, I'm so excited about the movie and we're really happy with how it turned out. [But with this being]...Whitney's last performance, it's hard. It's hard."

== Release ==
In December 2011, Sony announced the United States release date for Sparkle would be set for August 10, 2012. This was later pushed back by a week to August 17, 2012, due to Whitney Houston's death.

=== Home media ===
The film was released on DVD and Blu-ray Disc on November 30, 2012.

== Reception ==
On review aggregator Rotten Tomatoes, the film has a 57% approval rating based on 93 reviews. The site's critical consensus states: "While undeniably melodramatic and old-fashioned, Sparkle transcends its formulaic trappings thanks to Salim Akil's empathetic direction and strong performances from a committed cast". Metacritic, another review aggregator, assigned the film a weighted average score of 55 out of 100 based on 25 reviews from mainstream critics, considered to be "mixed or average reviews".

Critical praise has been particularly been given to Carmen Ejogo's performance. Film critic Roger Ebert of The Chicago Sun-Times awarded the film 3 stars, claiming Ejogo "steals the film not only in her sultry singing numbers but in her violent marriage to a snaky, evil comedian named Satin." While giving the film a negative review, The Globe and Mail critic Courtney Shea stated Ejogo, in comparison to Sparks' performance, was "in fact more dynamic, sexy and, dare we say, Bootylicious than the real thing – plays hardened vulnerability to perfection, so much so that you wonder (given her 38 years) where Hollywood has been hiding her." Mick LaSalle of the San Francisco Chronicle went as far as to suggest in his review that Ejogo's performance might place her under serious consideration for a Best Supporting Actress Oscar nomination. LaSalle comments: "...very few people will walk out of Sparkle talking about either Sparks or Houston, at least not at first. Instead they will be saying, "Who was that?" And they'll be referring to Carmen Ejogo...If there is any justice, Ejogo will become very famous very soon. As in, maybe today...It's rare to see someone become a movie star right before your eyes, but that's what happens with Ejogo in Sparkle....For an actress, this was the opportunity of a lifetime, and Ejogo plays it that way. She leaves nothing out, holds nothing back."

== Soundtrack ==
The soundtrack's first official lead single is the last song recorded by Whitney Houston before she died on February 11, 2012, a duet with R&B/pop singer and American Idol winner Jordin Sparks on a song called "Celebrate". The song premiered on On Air with Ryan Seacrest on May 21, 2012 and was made available for digital download on iTunes on June 5. Whitney Houston's other track, "His Eye Is On The Sparrow", debuted only one day after the premiere of "Celebrate". The official music video for Celebrate was filmed on May 30, 2012. It made its world premiere on BET's 106 & Park on June 27, 2012. For the week ending August 18, 2012 Sparkle: Original Motion Picture Soundtrack debuted on the Billboard 200 at number 26, number 7 on the Billboard Hot R&B/Hip-Hop Songs and at number 1 on the Billboard Soundtracks chart.

== Other media ==
In August 2012, Howard Rosenman reported that novelization rights of the movie were sold to Simon & Schuster. The book, written by Denene Millner, was published on August 7, 2012. Rosenman had also announced plans to team with director Joel Schumacher, one of the screenwriters of the original 1976 film, to add five new songs by Curtis Mayfield (in the original) and R. Kelly (in the 2012 version) for a Broadway musical of Sparkle.

== See also ==
- List of black films of the 2010s
