= Whisper Me a Lullaby =

- Directed by: Christina Vinsick
- Written by: Christina Vinsick
- Starring: Christina Vinsick
- Release date: November 2011 (Big Apple Film Festival)
- Running time: 83 minutes
- Country: United States
- Language: English

Whisper Me a Lullaby is a 2011 American drama film written by, directed by and starring Christina Vinsick.

== Cast ==
- Christina Vinsick as Charlie
- Peter Mychalcewycz as Scott
- Tika Sumpter as Emma
- Jason Downs as Nate
- Wyatt Kuether as Levy
- John Heard as "Poppy"

== Production ==
The film was shot entirely in the Hudson Valley.

== Accolade ==
The film won the "Best Feature Film" award at the Big Apple Film Festival.
