= Joe Forrester =

1975–1976 television series

- Genre: Police procedural Comedy-drama
- Starring: Lloyd Bridges; Pat Crowley; Eddie Egan; Dawn Smith
- Opening theme: Richard Markowitz
- Composer: Robert Drasnin
- Country of origin: United States
- No. of seasons: 1
- No. of episodes: 23

Production
- Executive producer: David Gerber
- Running time: 44 minutes (per episode)
- Production companies: David Gerber Productions; Columbia Pictures Television

Original release
- Network: NBC
- Release: September 9, 1975 – May 3, 1976

Related
- Police Story; Police Woman; David Cassidy: Man Undercover

Joe Forrester is a 1975 American police drama television series starring Lloyd Bridges, broadcast on NBC. It was cancelled after one season.

Bridges plays Forrester, a uniformed foot patrol officer in a run-down neighborhood of Los Angeles. Patricia Crowley co-starred as Georgia Cameron, Joe's romantic interest. Former NYPD Detective Eddie Egan played Sgt. Bernie Vincent, Joe's supervisor. Dwan Smith played Jolene, a resident of the neighborhood Joe patrolled.

== Character ==
Joe Forrester's character was introduced on the TV series Police Story, in a special 90-minute episode "The Return of Joe Forrester", written by Mark Rodgers and directed by Virgil W. Vogel, later retitled Cop on the Beat (1975), and syndicated as a television film. In this pilot, Forrester, a second generation policeman, is a plainclothes officer in LAPD's Metro Division who convinces his superiors to put him back in uniform, and back on a foot beat, in a neighborhood beset by a series of armed robberies which are invariably followed by a vicious rape. When the case is solved, Forrester elects to stay in uniform, and on his foot beat, leading to the subsequent series.

== Plot ==
Forrester is a veteran police officer in Los Angeles, assigned to a foot beat. He is a highly respected officer in the community, effectively fighting crime. As a patrolman, he is able to keep personal contact with the people he protects, building trust and empathy. Like other officers, he apprehends thieves, drug dealers, murderers, and other criminals.

== Episodes ==
No.	Title	Directed by	Written by	Original release date
0	"The Return of Joe Forrester"	Virgil W. Vogel	Mark Rodgers	May 6, 1975
1	"Stakeout"	Alf Kjellin	Dallas L. Barnes	September 9, 1975
2	"The Witness"	Unknown	Stephen Dowling	September 16, 1975
3	"Bus Station"	Alvin Ganzer	Frank Telford	September 23, 1975
4	"Welcome to the Gardens"	Barry Shear	S.S. Schweitzer	September 30, 1975
5	"Deadly Weekend: Part 1: Saturday"	Michael O'Herlihy	Mark Rodgers	November 4, 1975
6	"Deadly Weekend: Part 2: Sunday"	Michael O'Herlihy	Mark Rodgers	November 11, 1975
7	"Powder Blue"	Alvin Ganzer	Dallas L. Barnes	November 18, 1975
8	"Target: Mexican Syndicate"	Richard Benedict	Irv Pearlberg, Mark Rodgers	November 25, 1975
9	"No Probable Cause"	Alexander Singer	Mark Rodgers, Norman Jolley, Frank Telford	December 2, 1975
10	"The Best Laid Schemes"	Alf Kjellin	Dallas L. Barnes	December 9, 1975
11	"The End of Summer"	Unknown	Stephen Dowling	December 16, 1975
12	"Fashion Mart"	Unknown	Mark Rodgers	December 23, 1975
13	"Fire Power"	Unknown	Orville Hampton, Frank Telford	January 6, 1976
14	"An Act of Violence"	Alf Kjellin	Dallas L. Barnes	January 13, 1976
15	"The Answer"	Unknown	Rick Kelbaugh, Mark Rodgers	February 2, 1976
16	"Squeeze Play"	Barry Crane	Walter Dallenbach	February 9, 1976
17	"A Game of Lose"	Alf Kjellin	Robert Dellinger, Mark Rodgers	February 16, 1976
18	"Hard Core"	Alf Kjellin	Calvin Clements, Sr.	February 23, 1976
19	"Girl on a String"	Alvin Ganzer	Stephen Dowling, Mark Rodgers	March 1, 1976
20	"The Promised Land"	Russ Mayberry	Dallas L. Barnes	March 8, 1976
21	"Pressure Point"	Jerry London	Jack Miller	March 22, 1976
22	"The Boy Next Door"	Unknown	Dallas L. Barnes	May 3, 1976

== Reception ==
The San Antonio Express panned Joe Forrester, criticizing the plots for being improbable and for allowing the main character Forrester, a police officer, to solve cases better left to detectives.
