= The Nomads (2019 film) =

- Directed by: Brandon Eric Kamin
- Written by: Tara Miele
- Produced by: Brandon Eric Kamin; Aimee McDaniel; Miriam Marcus; Mark Donadio; Tika Sumpter
- Starring: Tika Sumpter; Tate Donovan
- Cinematography: Jonathan Nicholas
- Edited by: Conor Kelley
- Music by: Ben Decter
- Production companies: Bear Bear Productions; Game Changing Films; Moody Independent
- Release date: October 27, 2019

The Nomads is an American sports drama film directed by Brandon Eric Kamin, starring Tika Sumpter and Tate Donovan. The film premiered at the 28th Philadelphia Film Festival in October, 2019, and received the Filmadelphia Audience Award for Best Feature Film, as well as the Audience Award for Best Feature Film at the 2019 Napa Valley Film Festival. The film is inspired by the North Philly Nomads U19 rugby club and premiered on Bounce TV on January 20, 2020, on Martin Luther King Jr. Day.

== Cast ==
- Tika Sumpter as Cassey “Mac” McNamara
- Tate Donovan as Mark Nolin
- Thomas Pierce as Jaymie
- Vladimir Versailles as Banner
- Devon Ray as Kahlil
- Andy Riddle as O'Brien
- Marla Mindelle as Kate
- Christopher Mann as Principal Wade
- Khalil McMillan as Coach KJ
- Raekwon as Ice
