= Hell Squad (1985 film) =

- Directed by: Kenneth Hartford
- Written by: Kenneth Hartford
- Produced by: Kenneth Hartford
- Starring: Bainbridge Scott; Glen Hartford
- Cinematography: John McCoy
- Edited by: Robert Ernst
- Music by: Charles P. Barnett
- Distributed by: Cannon Film Distributors
- Release date: July 12, 1985
- Running time: 87 minutes
- Country: United States
- Language: English

Hell Squad (also known as Commando Squad and Commando Girls) is a 1985 action film. The film features a group of Las Vegas showgirls who aim to rescue the son of a diplomat.

== Premise ==
In order to rescue the son of a diplomat who has been kidnapped by terrorists, a group of Las Vegas showgirls undergo commando training and organize a rescue operation.
