= Carmen Ejogo =

British actress (born 1973)

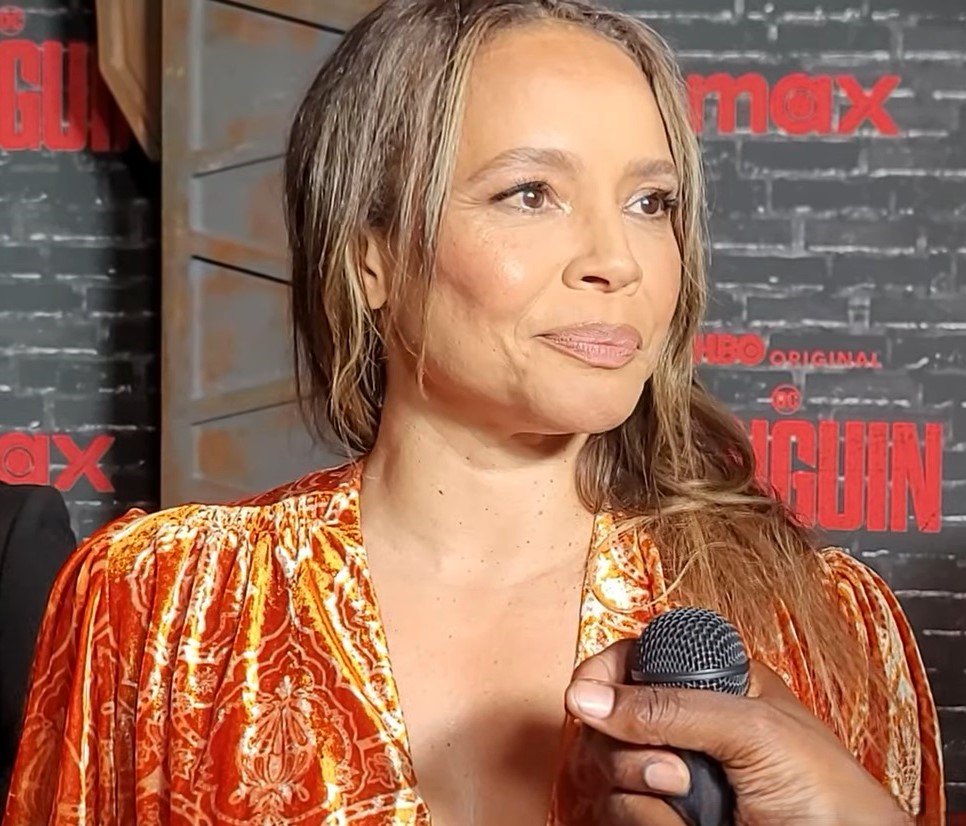
- Ejogo in 2024
- Born: Carmen Elizabeth Ejogo; 22 October 1973 (age 52); Kensington, London, England
- Occupations: Actress; singer
- Years active: 1986–present
- Spouses: Tricky (m. 1998; div. 1998) Jeffrey Wright (m. 2000; div. 2014)
- Children: 2
- Relatives: Charles Ejogo (brother)

Carmen Elizabeth Ejogo (/iˈdʒoʊɡoʊ/; born 22 October 1973) is a British actress and singer. She is best known for her roles in such films as Metro (1997), Love's Labour's Lost (2000), What's the Worst That Could Happen? (2001), Boycott (2001), Away We Go (2009), Sparkle (2012), Alex Cross (2012), The Purge: Anarchy (2014), Selma (2014), Fantastic Beasts and Where to Find Them (2016), It Comes at Night (2017), Alien: Covenant (2017), and Fantastic Beasts: The Crimes of Grindelwald (2018).

Ejogo also starred in the NBC crime drama series Kidnapped (2006–2007), the ABC thriller series Zero Hour (2013), the Starz anthology drama series The Girlfriend Experience (2017), the HBO anthology crime series True Detective (2019), the Netflix limited series Self Made (2020), and the Showtime series Your Honor (2021) opposite Bryan Cranston.

She appeared in the Boots Riley show, I'm a Virgo for Amazon.

== Early life ==
Ejogo was born on 22 October 1973 in Kensington, London and grew up in The Royal Borough of Kensington and Chelsea, London. She is the daughter of a Scottish mother, Elizabeth (née Douglas), and a Nigerian father, Charles Ejogo; her parents married in Kensington in 1973. She has a younger brother Charles Alexander born in 1976. Ejogo remembers her mother as having been "a bit of a hippie" during her childhood. She attended the Oratory Roman Catholic Primary School and Glendower Preparatory School, and was then educated at Godolphin and Latymer School. She grew up in a mixed environment in London, living in a council flat within the "posh areas" of Kensington and Chelsea. While the location sounds affluent, she has clarified that her upbringing was not a "posh" lifestyle, as her family had limited financial means.

== Career ==
She began her career as host of the Saturday Disney morning show from 1993 to 1995. Her film credits include The Avengers (1998) Love's Labour's Lost (2000), What's the Worst That Could Happen? (2001), Away We Go (2009), Sparkle (2012), Alex Cross (2012), The Purge: Anarchy (2014), It Comes at Night (2017), and Alien: Covenant (2017). She is also known for her role as Seraphina Picquery in the Fantastic Beasts film series. She plays Amelia Reardon in the HBO series True Detective (2019).

Ejogo has appeared as civil rights activist Coretta Scott King in two films: Boycott (2001) and Selma (2014). While preparing for the role in Boycott, she met with King and was given King's blessing for her portrayal.

=== Music career ===
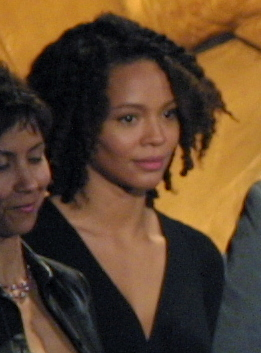
Ejogo in 2002

Ejogo has been involved in the music industry, having collaborated with several artists since the 1990s. She presented The Carmen Ejogo Video Show, her own video show on BSB's Power Station channel.

She wrote and sang lead vocals on the song "Candles" by English drum 'n' bass DJ Alex Reece—she appeared in the music video and is listed in the production credits as "Carmen". Ejogo also sang vocals and duets with ex-husband Tricky on a song called "Slowly". She sang vocals for the film Love's Labour's Lost (2000).

Aside from "Candles", Ejogo appears on four songs of the Sparkle original soundtrack album from the movie of the same name, singing lead on "Yes I Do" (as a solo), and lead vocals with Jordin Sparks and Tika Sumpter singing backup on "Jump", "Hooked on Your Love" and "Something He Can Feel". She also starred as Rose Angelina in Catherine Cookson's Colour Blind.

== Personal life ==
Ejogo was briefly married to trip-hop artist Tricky. In 2000, she married American actor Jeffrey Wright, whom she met while making the HBO film Boycott. They have a son and a daughter. Ejogo and Wright have since divorced.

== Filmography ==
=== Film ===
Year	Title	Role	Notes
1986	Absolute Beginners	Carmen	
1997	Metro	Veronica "Ronnie" Tate	
1998	I Want You	Amber	
1998	The Avengers	Brenda	
1999	Tube Tales	Girl	Segment: "Steal Away"
2000	Love's Labour's Lost	Maria	
2001	Perfume	Chloe	
2001	What's the Worst That Could Happen?	Amber Belhaven	
2004	Noel	Dr Batiste	
2007	The Brave One	Jackie	
2008	Pride and Glory	Tasha	
2009	Away We Go	Grace De Tessant	
2012	Sparkle	Tammy "Sister" Anderson	
2012	Alex Cross	Maria Cross	
2014	The Purge: Anarchy	Eva Sanchez	
2014	Selma	Coretta Scott King	
2015	Born to Be Blue	Jane / Elaine	
2016	Fantastic Beasts and Where to Find Them	President Seraphina Picquery	
2017	It Comes at Night	Sarah	
2017	Alien: Covenant	Karine Oram	
2017	Roman J. Israel, Esq.	Maya Alston	
2018	Fantastic Beasts: The Crimes of Grindelwald	President Seraphina Picquery	
2019	Rattlesnake	Katrina Ridgeway	Also executive producer
2022	Forty Winks	Nina Sherman	
2024	Goodrich	Lola Thompson	
2025	Fountain of Youth	Deb McCall	
TBA	Harvest Moon	Adele	Post-production
TBA	The Julia Set †		Post-production

=== Television ===
Year	Title	Role	Notes
1996	Cold Lazarus	Blinda	Main role
1998	Catherine Cookson's Colour Blind	Rose-Angela Patterson	2 episodes
1998	Tube Tales	Girl	1 episode
2000	Sally Hemings: An American Scandal	Sally Hemings	Television film
2001	Boycott	Coretta Scott King	Television film
2005	Lackawanna Blues	Alean Hudson	Television film
2006–2007	Kidnapped	Turner	Main role
2007	M.O.N.Y.	Francine Tyson	Television short film
2008	Law & Order	April Lannen	1 episode
2011	CHAOS	Fay Carson	Main role
2013	Zero Hour	Rebecca "Beck" Riley	Main role
2017	The Girlfriend Experience	Bria Jones	Recurring role (season 2)
2019	True Detective	Amelia Reardon	Main role
2020	Self Made	Annie Malone	Main role
2020–2021	Your Honor	Lee Delamere	Main role
2023	The Crowded Room	DDA Patricia Richards	Recurring role
2023	I'm a Virgo	LaFrancine	Main role
2024	The Penguin	Eve Karlo	Main role
2025	Wild Cherry	Lorna Gibbons	Main role

=== Video games ===
Year	Title	Voice role
2016	Lego Dimensions	Seraphina Picquery

== Awards and nominations ==
Association	Year	Category	Nominated work	Result
Black Reel Awards	2001	Best Actress, Network/Cable	Sally Hemings: An American Scandal	Nominated
Black Reel Awards	2006	Best Supporting Actress, Television	Lackawanna Blues	Won
Black Reel Awards	2015	Best Supporting Actress, Motion Picture	Selma	Won
Black Reel Awards	2018	Best Supporting Actress, Motion Picture	It Comes at Night	Nominated
Black Reel Awards	2018	Best Supporting Actress, TV Movie/Limited Series	The Girlfriend Experience	Nominated
Black Reel Awards	2019	Best Supporting Actress, TV Movie/Limited Series	True Detective	Nominated
Black Reel Awards	2020	Best Supporting Actress, TV Movie/Limited Series	Self Made	Nominated
Canadian Screen Awards	2016	Best Actress	Born to Be Blue	Nominated
Georgia Film Critics Association	2015	Best Acting Ensemble	Selma	Nominated
Independent Spirit Awards	2015	Best Supporting Female	Selma	Nominated
NAACP Image Awards	2002	Outstanding Actress in a TV Movie, Mini-Series or Dramatic Special	Boycott	Nominated
NAACP Image Awards	2006	Outstanding Actress in a TV Movie, Mini-Series or Dramatic Special	Lackawanna Blues	Nominated
NAACP Image Awards	2015	Outstanding Supporting Actress in a Motion Picture	Selma	Won
San Diego Film Critics Society	2014	Best Acting Ensemble	Selma	Nominated
Washington DC Area Film Critics Association	2014	Best Acting Ensemble	Selma	Nominated
