= His Eye Is on the Sparrow =

1905 gospel hymn

"His Eye is on the Sparrow"
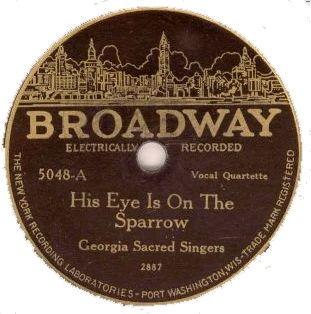

Song
- Published: 1905 in Revival Hymns (Bible Institute Colportage Association)
- Songwriter: Civilla D. Martin
- Composer: Charles H. Gabriel

"His Eye Is on the Sparrow" is a gospel hymn written in 1905 by lyricist Civilla D. Martin and composer Charles H. Gabriel. Inspired by passages from the Bible, the song has become one of the most enduring and frequently recorded gospel standards. It is closely associated with actress-singer Ethel Waters, who used the title for her autobiography and helped popularize the hymn in the early 20th century. Over the decades, "His Eye Is on the Sparrow" has been recorded by numerous artists. Lauryn Hill and Tanya Blount's 1993 performance of the song in the film Sister Act 2: Back in the Habit became one of the most definitive renditions for modern audiences.

Mahalia Jackson's influential recording of the hymn was inducted into the Grammy Hall of Fame in 2010. Whitney Houston recorded a version for the soundtrack of the 2012 film Sparkle, which became a posthumous number one gospel single on the Billboard charts. The song was also covered by pop singer Jessica Simpson as the final track on her 2001 album Irresistible. A slightly altered version of the song, titled "His Eye Is on the Tiny Bird," was recorded by actress Violet Carson in 1972.

== Inspiration ==
The theme of the song is inspired by the words of David in the Psalms and Jesus in the Gospel of Matthew in the Bible: "I will instruct thee and teach thee in the way which thou shalt go: I will guide thee with mine eye" (Psalm 32:8). "Look at the birds of the air; they neither sow nor reap nor gather into barns, and yet your heavenly Father feeds them. Are you not of more value than they?" (Matthew 6:26) and "Are not two sparrows sold for a farthing? and one of them shall not fall on the ground without your Father. But the very hairs of your head are all numbered. Fear ye not therefore, ye are of more value than many sparrows" (Matthew 10:29–31).

Civilla Martin, who wrote the lyrics, said of her inspiration to write the song based on the scriptures:

Early in the spring of 1905, my husband and I were sojourning in Elmira, New York. We contracted a deep friendship for a couple by the name of Mr. and Mrs. Doolittle—true saints of God. Mrs. Doolittle had been bedridden for nigh twenty years. Her husband was an incurable cripple who had to propel himself to and from his business in a wheel chair. Despite their afflictions, they lived happy Christian lives, bringing inspiration and comfort to all who knew them. One day while we were visiting with the Doolittles, my husband commented on their bright hopefulness and asked them for the secret of it. Mrs. Doolittle's reply was simple: "His eye is on the sparrow, and I know He watches me." The beauty of this simple expression of boundless faith gripped the hearts and fired the imagination of Dr. Martin and me. The hymn "His Eye Is on the Sparrow" was the outcome of that experience.

== Later published arrangements ==
There are many arrangements of the hymn that have been produced since its original publication. These include:

- 1963: in The Reader's Digest Family Songbook of Faith and Joy
- 1975: in The Josh White Songbook
- 1986: Five American Gospel Songs for solo voice and piano by Luigi Zaninelli includes a concert arrangement of it
- 1999: Six Gospel Hymn Preludes has an arrangement for solo organ by Wilbur Held
- 2007: in Songs of Comfort and Hope: Vocal Solos for Memorial and Funeral Services

== Lauryn Hill and Tanya Blount version ==
In 1993, Lauryn Hill and Tanya Blount recorded a version of "His Eye Is on the Sparrow" for the soundtrack of the film Sister Act 2: Back in the Habit. Lauryn Hill's performance is noted as the first time she was prominently featured singing on her own prior to her success with The Fugees and as a solo artist.

In the film, Hill's character Rita Louise Watson and Blount's character harmonize on the hymn during a quiet moment, conveying the emotional stakes of Rita's conflict over her musical ambitions. The scene was directed by Bill Duke, who, along with Whoopi Goldberg, adapted it into the script specifically to showcase Hill and Blount's vocal talents.

=== Reception ===
Although Sister Act 2 received mixed reviews upon release, their performance was singled out as a highlight, and became one of the film's most iconic scenes. Reviewing Sister Act 2 in 1993, Entertainment Weekly praised Lauryn Hill's brief performance of "His Eye Is on the Sparrow" as a standout moment, describing it as the first "genuinely religious" scene in the film. Writing for 4Columns, critic Andrew Chan praised Hill's delivery as "aching and emotionally immersive", noting that it anticipated the artistry she would later display on her 1998 solo album The Miseducation of Lauryn Hill.

In a 2018 retrospective, Vice praised the song's vocal performance as a "soaring moment of genuine gospel vocalizing", but criticized the scene's direction for interrupting the performance too early, arguing the film failed to fully showcase her talent. The film helped propel Hill and Blount into wider recognition. Blount, now performing under the name Tonya Trotter, later reflected that performing "His Eye Is on the Sparrow" alongside Hill "changed the trajectory of [her] life."

=== Impact ===
Lauryn Hill and Tanya Blount's rendition of "His Eye Is on the Sparrow" is often recognized as one of the most recognizable interpretations of the hymn. Religious leader Bishop Michael Curry noted the Hill-Blount version of "His Eye Is on the Sparrow" for helping to make the hymn famous for modern audiences in his 2020 book Love Is the Way: Holding on to Hope in Troubling Times. In 2023, the Museum of the Moving Image referred to Hill's performance on "His Eye Is on the Sparrow" as one of the musical highlights of the 1990s.

Jennifer Hudson performed "His Eye Is on the Sparrow" on her talk show in 2022, describing it as one of her favorite songs and linking it to the impact of Sister Act 2. Pop star Katy Perry cited Hill's performance of "His Eye Is on the Sparrow" as a major influence during her upbringing, stating in a 2008 Rolling Stone interview, "I was raised on 'Oh Happy Day' and 'His Eye Is on the Sparrow' and the Sister Act soundtracks — I was so down with Lauryn Hill in Sister Act 2." Their duet continues to influence new generations of singers. Artists such as Kelly Clarkson, Colbie Caillat, August Alsina, and Kamille have credited the performance as an early inspiration for pursuing careers in music.

== Whitney Houston version ==
"His Eye Is on the Sparrow"

Single by Whitney Houston

from the album Sparkle: Original Motion Picture Soundtrack
- Released: June 8, 2012
- Recorded: 2011
- Studio: Mason Sound (North Hollywood, CA); RMS Studios (Detroit, MI)
- Genre: Gospel
- Length: 3:32
- Label: RCA Records
- Songwriters: Civilla D. Martin; Charles H. Gabriel
- Producer: R. Kelly

Whitney Houston singles chronology
"Celebrate" (2012)	"His Eye Is on the Sparrow" (2012)	"I Look to You" (2012)

Whitney Houston recorded a version for the soundtrack of the 2012 remake of the 1976 musical film Sparkle. RCA Records released the song as the second single from the album on June 8, 2012, four months after Houston's death. This version is Houston's last original single, and second posthumous one. The song made its debut only one day after the premiere of "Celebrate". The song became Houston's second posthumous number one single on the Billboard charts, reaching the top spot on the Billboard Gospel Digital Song Sales chart in June 2012, preceded by her original recording of "I Look to You".

=== Critical reception ===
AllMusic called it a "piano, organ, and choir" showcase for Houston, citing it as a highlight of the soundtrack although admitting "Houston sounds as commanding as one can expect from a later recording." Entertainment Weekly editor Melissa Maerz called it "a gorgeously rippling solo" with Houston "testif[ying ...] that Jesus is watching over her." Jody Rosen of Rolling Stone panned the cover, saying "Houston sings – and croaks – in a voice octaves lower than in her prime. At times the song has a ravaged magnificence, but mostly it's painful." Huffington Post compared her vocals on the song to that of Billie Holiday's in her penultimate album, Lady in Satin, and stated that near the end of her life, Houston "reclaimed her gospel youth, her class and an appearance of pained but persistent dignity".

=== Charts ===
2012 weekly chart performance for Houston's His Eye Is on the Sparrow
Chart (2012)	Peak position
US Gospel Digital Songs (Billboard)	1
