= Yvonne Gage =

American singer (born 1959)

- Born: Yvonne Gage; December 20, 1959 (age 66); Chicago, Illinois, U.S.
- Genres: R&B; Soul
- Occupation: Singer
- Instrument: Vocals
- Years active: 1978–present
- Labels: C.I.M.; Atlantic
- Website: yvonnegage.com

Yvonne Gage (born December 20, 1959) is an American singer from Chicago, Illinois. Active since the late 1970s, she has done background vocals for artists prior to and after her own solo success.

As a session musician, she has provided vocals for many well known artists, including the incomparable Queen of Soul, Aretha Franklin, as well as Stevie Wonder, Michael McDonald, The Doobie Brothers, Ministry, Celine Dion, Ashford & Simpson, Kem, Janelle Monáe, and Kindred the Family Soul.

== Biography ==
Gage began singing in the church choir. At 14, She joined a local R&B band, The Soulettes, and sang with them for seven years. During this time, the band was renamed "First Love", then simply "Love", and released an album, Love at First Sight, under the independent Chicago International Music label in 1980.

However, Gage already had left the band at the time of release, to become a backing vocalist for Captain Sky. While touring with him, and beside acts such as Cameo, Stephanie Mills, Kleeer and Smokey Robinson, she met Don Burnside, Captain's Sky producer at the time.

He produced her first solo single, "Garden of Eve", in 1981 for Atlantic Records. The track managed to enter the Dance Club Songs chart, and rank at number 36.

Burnside also introduced her to then playing new wave band Ministry. Gage took part in their With Sympathy tour, appearing alongside Madness, The Police and Culture Club. After finishing touring, she recorded a commercial for Ultra-Curl, before going back to studio.

=== Virginity (1984) ===
Gage then went to record her first album, Virginity. It was produced by Burnside, and released in 1984 under Chicago International Music. Its cover featured mildly risque figures of the singer wearing a seal-fur coat. The album features a song called "Doin' It in a Haunted House," which was heavily inspired by, and described as the "unofficial answer to Michael Jackson's 'Thriller'" by Billboard. Although the song was released on Epic/CBS Records like "Thriller," producer Rod Temperton sued Gage for plagiarism. According to her, he "wasn't interested in collecting any money, he just wanted to kill [her] record."

"Doin' It in a Haunted House" reached number 45 in the UK Singles chart, and 78 on the US Hot R&B/Hip-Hop Songs, then called the "Black Singles" charts. "Lover of My Dreams," a non-album single, also entered the UK Top 40 charts, ranking at number 79 for three weeks. That would be her last single to enter the charts.

She later released singles in 1990, 2002 and 2011, but never meeting with her 1980s success again. In 1999, she collaborated once again with Ministry, contributing backing vocals on Dark Side of the Spoon's "Eureka Pile." She is also a vocal teacher at Chicago's Roosevelt University.

== Discography ==
=== Albums ===
''Virginity''

- Released: 1984
- Format: LP
- Label: Chicago International Music, Epic
- Producer: Don Burnside
- Singles: "Doin' It in a Haunted House", "Lover of My Dreams"

=== Singles ===
| Year | Title | Label | Peak chart positions | | | |
| Year | Title | Label | U.S. Top 40 | U.S. Dance | U.S. R&B | UK Singles Chart |
|---|---|---|---|---|---|---|
| 1981 | "Garden Of Eve" | Atlantic | ― | #36 | ― | ― |
| 1983 | "Love's Gonna Pay You Back" | C.I.M. | ― | ― | ― | ― |
| 1984 | "Lover of My Dreams" | C.I.M. | ― | ― | ― | #79 |
| 1984 | "Doin' It In A Haunted House" | C.I.M. | ― | ― | #78 | #45 |
| 1984 | "Virginity" | C.I.M. | ― | ― | ― | ― |
| 1990 | "Winter Days & Summer Nights" | Trax | ― | ― | ― | ― |
| 2002 | "Mirror, Mirror" | Slang | ― | ― | ― | ― |
| 2011 | "My Freedom" | audioJazz | ― | ― | ― | ― |
| 2018 | "Tonight's The Night" | Star Creature | ― | ― | ― | ― |
| 2018 | "You Can Have It All" | Star Creature | ― | ― | ― | ― |
"—" denotes releases that did not chart
