= Civilla D. Martin =

Canadian-American songwriter

Civilla Durfee Holden Martin
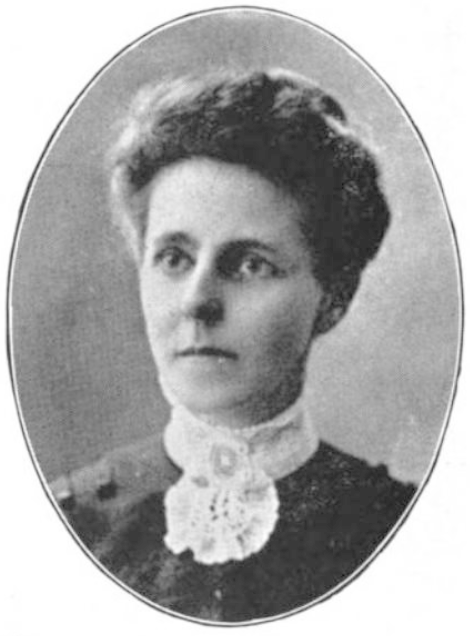
- Martin in 1916
- Born: August 21, 1866; Jordan, Nova Scotia, Canada
- Died: March 9, 1948 (aged 81); Atlanta, Georgia, U.S.
- Burial place: Westview Cemetery
- Occupation: Songwriter
- Spouse: Walter Stillman Martin

Civilla Durfee Holden Martin (August 21, 1866 – March 9, 1948) was a Canadian-American writer of many religious hymns and gospel songs in the late 19th century and early 20th century.

== Biography ==
Civilla Durfee was born in Jordan, Nova Scotia on August 21, 1866.

Her husband, Walter Stillman Martin (1862–1935), studied ministry at Harvard University, where he became a Baptist minister but later switched to the Disciples of Christ. Together they created hymns and songs which have become widely known. Some of her most popular pieces include "God Will Take Care of You", "One of God's Days", "Going Home", "The Old Fashioned Way", and "His Eye Is on the Sparrow".

She died at her home in Atlanta on March 9, 1948, and was buried at Westview Cemetery.
