= Charles Ejogo =

British entrepreneur

Charles Ejogo (born 1976) is a Nigerian-British entrepreneur who is the inventor of the Umbrolly umbrella vending machine. Ejogo appeared on the first episode of the UK television programme Dragons' Den in 2005, where he "won" £150,000 funding (£265,300 today) for his "Umbrolly" umbrella vending machines.

== Early life and career ==
Born and raised in Chelsea, London, Ejogo is the son of Charles (Snr) and Elizabeth Douglas. His father (now deceased) was a Nigerian entrepreneur and his mother a Scottish tour guide. Ejogo attended the London Oratory School in Fulham, before going on to read law at Staffordshire University, and then History and Politics at Goldsmiths, University of London.

Ejogo worked in private banking for Merrill Lynch (in New York City and London) and then briefly for Deutsche Bank before going on to set up Umbrolly.

== Dragons' Den ==
In 2005, Ejogo succeeded in the first ever episode of the British version of the business reality television programme Dragons' Den. In the episode, broadcast on 5 January 2005, his pitch for investment in an umbrella vending machine business resulted in Duncan Bannatyne and Peter Jones making a joint offer of £150,000, which he accepted. Seven months later, the deal collapsed and taking the advice of Dragon Peter Jones, Ejogo set up a new company without his original business partners, allowing him to start afresh.

== Umbrolly ==
After the collapse of the deal in the Dragons' Den, Ejogo began working with Seymour Powell to design, and launch a new smaller umbrella vending machine. In October 2007, he secured equity investment from Burlington Investment Partners to relaunch the business. Between 2008 and 2010, Ejogo expanded the business into France, Germany, the Netherlands, the Republic of Ireland, and the US. In March 2010, the UK arm of the business ceased to trade, when it lost its UK operating partner, Photo-Me International, following the resignation of its CEO. The business still provides consultative services, and overseas sales of its products to new and existing customers.

== Awards ==
Ejogo was awarded the "Innovator of the Year" award by the Department of Trade and Industry in 2006, winning the BT Vending "Innovation of the Year" award, in the same year. In 2007, his Umbrolly vending machines won runner-up in the "Product of the Year" category for Vending Magazine.

== Public speaking ==
Ejogo has spoken at numerous public events including "Winners – The Rise and Rise of Black British Entrepreneurs" at the British Library, and "Coffee, Croissants, and £2,000,000 Investment" in association with Grant Thornton. He also shared the speaking platform with Peter Jones at The Guardian Graduate Fair in 2008. He is a passionate supporter of youth and children's enterprise, speaking at the London School of Economics, Bristol University, and numerous schools across the UK.
