= Tika Sumpter =

American actress

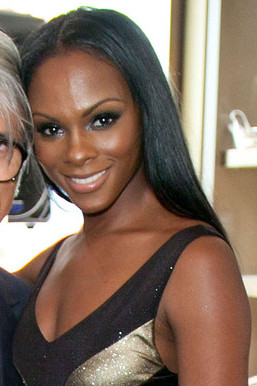
- Sumpter in 2013
- Born: Euphemia LatiQue Sumpter; New York City, U.S.
- Education: Marymount Manhattan College
- Occupations: Actress; producer; television host
- Years active: 2000–present
- Spouse: Nicholas James (m. 2022)
- Children: 1

Euphemia LatiQue "Tika" Sumpter is an American actress and producer. Sumpter began her career as the host of Best Friend's Date. From 2005 to 2010, she appeared in the daytime soap opera One Life to Live. In 2010, she made her film debut in Stomp the Yard: Homecoming and later featured in supporting roles for What's Your Number? (2011), Sparkle (2012), and A Madea Christmas (2013).

In 2011, Sumpter had a recurring role in Gossip Girl. From 2013 to 2021, Sumpter starred as Candace Young in the OWN prime time soap opera, The Haves and the Have Nots. During that time, she starred in the action comedy film Ride Along (2014) and its sequel Ride Along 2 (2016), the biographical drama Get On Up (2014), the crime drama The Old Man & the Gun (2018), and the romantic comedy Nobody's Fool (2018). In 2016, she produced and starred as Michelle Robinson Obama in the biographical romantic drama film, Southside with You receiving NAACP Image Award for Outstanding Actress in a Motion Picture nomination. From 2019 to 2021, she starred in the ABC comedy series, Mixed-ish. She later starred as Maddie Wachowski in the Sonic the Hedgehog franchise as well as the spin-off show, Knuckles (2020-present).

== Early life ==
Sumpter was born in Queens, New York City. She was a cheerleader at her high school. She graduated from Longwood Senior High School in Middle Island, New York and studied at Marymount Manhattan College where she majored in communications.

== Career ==
=== 2000–2011 ===
Sumpter began her career as a model and appeared in commercials for Hewlett-Packard and Liz Claiborne's Curve fragrances. She also worked as a waitress before acting. In 2004, she served as the co-host for the reality series Best Friend's Date, which was broadcast on Nickelodeon's defunct cable channel The N, now titled TeenNick. The following year she landed the role of Layla Williamson in the ABC daytime soap opera, One Life to Live. For her portrayal of Layla, Sumpter was nominated for an NAACP Image Award for Best Actress in a Daytime Drama Series in 2008. She first appeared on-screen on July 15, 2005, playing the role regularly through September 14, 2010. Sumpter reappeared in the role on November 9–10, 2010, and January 21 and 24, 2011.

In 2010, Sumpter made her film debut in Stomp the Yard: Homecoming and briefly appeared in Salt. From January to May 2011, Sumpter appeared in The CW teen drama series, Gossip Girl as Raina Thorpe. She played singer Jason Derülo's girlfriend in the video for his song "It Girl". In 2011, she appeared in the romantic comedy film What's Your Number?. From 2011 to 2012 she also had a recurring role as Jenna Rice in the BET comedy series, The Game.

=== 2012–2015 ===
Sumpter played Delores "Dee" Anderson in the musical-drama Sparkle, inspired by the story of The Supremes. Sumpter is heard on the Sparkle: Original Motion Picture Soundtrack, and appears in the music video for "Celebrate". After Sparkle, she starred alongside John Stamos in the independent comedy film My Man Is a Loser. The film received limited theatrical release on July 25, 2014, by Lionsgate Films. In 2013, she starred in the Christmas comedy film A Madea Christmas by Tyler Perry. Perry later cast Sumpter as a lead character and main villainess Candace Young in the Oprah Winfrey Network prime time soap opera The Haves and the Have Nots. The series was a hit for the Oprah Winfrey Network. The series premiered on May 28, 2013, and ran for 8 seasons until July 20, 2021.

In 2014, Sumpter co-starred in the action comedy film, Ride Along, opposite Kevin Hart and Ice Cube. The film grossed $153.2 million worldwide. She reprised her role in the 2016 sequel Ride Along 2. Like the original film, this sequel was panned by most critics but was a box office success, grossing $124.6 million worldwide during its theatrical run. The third film was announced but was not filmed. In 2014, She played Yvonne Fair, one of Brown’s former lovers, in Get on Up, the biographical drama film about James Brown. She co-starred opposite Queen Latifah, Mo'Nique, and Khandi Alexander in the HBO biographical film Bessie about the blues singer Bessie Smith that premiered in 2015.

=== 2016–present ===
Sumpter played a young Michelle Robinson in the biographical romantic drama film, Southside with You about the early romance between Barack and Michelle Obama. The film premiered at the 2016 Sundance Film Festival and received positive reviews from critics. Sumpter also co-produced the film. The film premiered at the 2016 Sundance Film Festival, where it garnered critical acclaim. In his Sundance review, The Hollywood Reporter‘s chief film critic Todd McCarthy wrote: “From the first second she’s onscreen, the striking Tika Sumpter is 100 percent the Michelle Obama the public has come to know: formidable, intellectually probing and a bit fierce.” Sumpter received Gotham Awards and NAACP Image Award for Outstanding Actress in a Motion Picture nominations for this performance. Sumpter is an honorary member of Alpha Kappa Alpha sorority. She was inducted into the organization on July 10, 2016, at the 67th annual Boule, in Atlanta, Georgia.

In 2018, Sumpter appeared opposite Robert Redford and Casey Affleck in the crime drama film, The Old Man & the Gun, directed by David Lowery. She received Women's Image Network Award nomination for Best Supporting Actress. Also that year, she starred the comedy-drama film Nobody's Fool for Paramount Players. It received negative reviews from critics and grossed $33 million worldwide. The following year, she starred in the political thriller An Acceptable Loss written and directed by Joe Chappelle. She also starred and produced the sports drama film The Nomads that premiered at the 28th Philadelphia Film Festival.

In 2019, Sumpter was cast in the ABC comedy series, Mixed-ish, a prequel spinoff of Black-ish, playing the role of Alicia, Rainbow's mother. The series was canceled after two seasons in 2021. In 2020, she starred as Maddie Wachowski in the action-adventure comedy film, Sonic the Hedgehog based on the video game franchise. It grossed $319 million worldwide, becoming the sixth highest-grossing film of 2020. She reprised her role in the 2022 sequel, that grossed over $405 million worldwide. A sequel, Sonic the Hedgehog 3, was released on December 20, 2024.

In 2023, Sumpter made her directing debut with the short film Night Off which premiered at the 2023 Sundance Film Festival. She had a recurring role in the second season of Starz comedy series, Run the World. She starred opposite Snoop Dogg in the sports comedy film The Underdoggs that is set to release on January 26, 2024 by MGM.

In 2024, Sumpter created Adventures of Curiosity Cove, a children's podcast produced by her company, Fort Sumpter. She has said the series grew out of the bedtime stories she told her daughter. In November 2025, the show joined iHeartMedia's The Black Effect Podcast Network as the network's first title in the kids and family genre.

== Personal life ==
Sumpter's daughter by her The Haves and the Have Nots co-star Nicholas James was born on October 8, 2016, and named Ella-Loren. In January 2017, Sumpter and James were engaged, and they married in 2022.

== Filmography ==
=== Film ===
Year	Title	Role	Notes
2009	Brooklyn's Finest	Neighborhood girl	Uncredited
2010	Stomp the Yard: Homecoming	Nikki	
2010	Salt	Front deskwoman	
2011	Whisper Me a Lullaby	Emma	
2011	What's Your Number?	Jamie	
2012	Think Like a Man	Dominic's Girlfriend	
2012	Sparkle	Delores "Dee" Anderson	
2013	A Madea Christmas	Lacey	
2014	Ride Along	Angela Payton	
2014	My Man Is a Loser	Clarissa	
2014	Get On Up	Yvonne Fair	Nominated — Black Reel Award for Best Ensemble
2015	You Never Left	Euphemia	Short film
2016	Ride Along 2	Angela Payton-Barber	
2016	Southside with You	Michelle Robinson	Also producer Chicago Independent Film Critics Circle Award for Best Chicago Film; Nominated — Gotham Award — Audience Award; Nominated — NAACP Image Award for Outstanding Actress in a Motion Picture; Nominated — Indiana Film Journalists Association for Breakout of the Year
2018	The Old Man & the Gun	Maureen	Nominated — Women's Image Network Award for Best Supporting Actress
2018	Nobody's Fool	Danica	
2019	An Acceptable Loss	Elizabeth "Libby" Lamm	
2019	The Nomads	Cassey McNamara	Also producer Philadelphia Film Festival Award for Best Feature Film
2020	Sonic the Hedgehog	Maddie Wachowski/Pretzel Lady	
2022	Sonic the Hedgehog 2	Maddie Wachowski/Pretzel Lady	
2024	The Underdoggs	Cherise	
2024	Sonic the Hedgehog 3	Maddie Wachowski	
2027	Sonic the Hedgehog 4	Maddie Wachowski	Filming

=== Television ===
Year	Title	Role	Notes
2004–05	Best Friend's Date	Herself	Host
2005–11	One Life to Live	Layla Williamson	Series regular, 234 episodes Nominated—NAACP Image Award for Outstanding Actress in a Daytime Drama Series (2008)
2006	Law & Order: Special Victims Unit	Vegas	Episode: "Class"
2011	Gossip Girl	Raina Thorpe	Recurring role, 11 episodes
2011–12	The Game	Jenna Rice	Recurring role, 10 episodes
2013	Being Mary Jane	Tonya	Episode: "Pilot"
2013–21	The Haves and the Have Nots	Candace Young	Series regular
2015	Bessie	Lucille	Television film
2018–21	Final Space	Quinn, Nightfall	Animated series
2019–21	Mixed-ish	Alicia Johnson	Series regular
2023	Run the World	Naomi	Recurring role
2024	Knuckles	Maddie Wachowski	Episode: "The Warrior"
2025	Survival of the Thickest	Simone	5 episodes
2025	Watson	Laila Bynum	Recurring role

=== Video games ===
Year	Title	Voice role
2022	Final Space: The Rescue	Nightfall
