= Saving Abel discography =

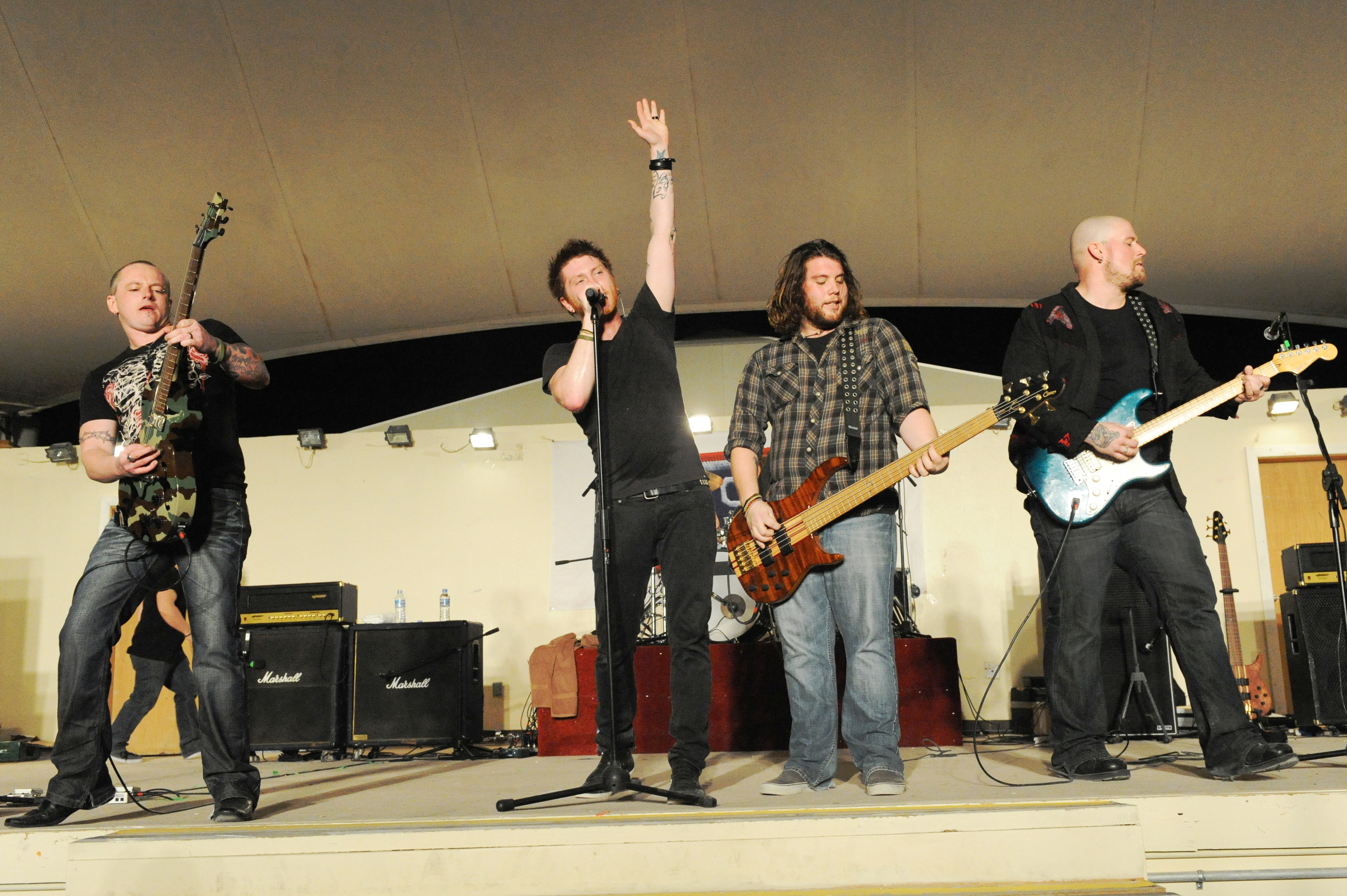
- Saving Abel performing in 2010
- Studio albums: 4
- Extended plays: 2
- Singles: 10
- Music videos: 8

The discography of Saving Abel, an American hard rock band, consists of four studio albums, seven singles and six music videos.

== Albums ==
=== Studio albums ===
List of studio albums, with selected chart positions and certifications
| Title | Album details | Peak chart positions | | | | | | Certifications |
| Title | Album details | US | US Alt. | US Ind. | US Rock | AUS | CAN | Certifications |
|---|---|---|---|---|---|---|---|---|
| Saving Abel | Released: March 11, 2008; Label: Virgin; Formats: CD, digital download | 49 | 10 | — | 14 | 80 | — | RIAA: Platinum |
| Miss America | Released: June 8, 2010; Label: Virgin; Formats: CD, digital download | 24 | 3 | — | 4 | — | 99 | |
| Bringing Down the Giant | Released: July 17, 2012; Label: eOne; Formats: CD, digital download | 74 | 15 | 17 | 25 | — | — | |
| Blood Stained Revolution | Released: November 11, 2014; Label: Tennessippi Whiskey Records; Formats: CD, digital download | — | — | — | — | — | — | |
"—" denotes a recording that did not chart or was not released in that territory.

== Extended plays ==
List of extended plays
| Title | EP details |
|---|---|
| 18 Days Tour EP | Released: April 7, 2009; Label: Virgin; Formats: CD |
| Crackin' the Safe | Released: August 6, 2013; Label: Hell No Pick'n/JHMP |

== Singles ==
List of singles, with selected chart positions and certifications, showing year released and album name
| Title | Year | Peak chart positions | | | | | | | | | Certifications | Album |
| Title | Year | US | US Adult | US Alt. | US Main. Rock | US Pop | US Rock | US Hard Digi. | AUS | CAN | Certifications | Album |
|---|---|---|---|---|---|---|---|---|---|---|---|---|
| "Addicted" | 2008 | 20 | 10 | 7 | 2 | 7 | — | 4 | 36 | 44 | RIAA: 5× Platinum; MC: Gold; RMNZ: Gold | Saving Abel |
| "18 Days" | 2008 | — (Note: "18 Days" did not enter the Billboard Hot 100, but peaked at number 4 on the Bubbling Under Hot 100 chart.) | 32 | 10 | 6 | 32 | — | — | — | — | RIAA: Gold | Saving Abel |
| "Drowning (Face Down)" | 2009 | — | — | 23 | 3 | — | 10 | — | — | — | | Saving Abel |
| "Stupid Girl (Only in Hollywood)" | 2010 | — | — | 31 | 7 | — | 22 | — | — | — | | Miss America |
| "The Sex Is Good" | 2010 | — | — | 22 | 1 | — | 10 | 13 | — | — | RIAA: Gold | Miss America |
| "Miss America" | 2011 | — | — | — | 14 | — | 36 | — | — | — | | Miss America |
| "Bringing Down the Giant" | 2012 | — | — | — | 13 | — | 37 | — | — | — | | Bringing Down the Giant |
| "Mystify" | 2013 | — | — | — | — | — | — | — | — | — | | Crackin' The Safe (EP) |
| "Silent Night" | 2013 | — | — | — | — | — | — | — | — | — | | Non-album single |
| "Blood Stained Revolution" | 2014 | — | — | — | — | — | — | — | — | — | | Blood Stained Revolution |
| "Love Like Suicide" | 2014 | — | — | — | — | — | — | — | — | — | | Blood Stained Revolution |
| "15 Minutes of Fame" | 2015 | — | — | — | — | — | — | — | — | — | | Blood Stained Revolution |
| "Counting Stars" (with No Resolve) (OneRepublic cover | 2023 | — | — | — | — | — | — | 12 | — | — | | Non-album singles |
| "Baptize Me" | 2023 | — | — | — | — | — | — | — | — | — | | Non-album singles |
| "Fire" | 2023 | — | — | — | 36 | — | — | — | — | — | | Non-album singles |
| "Dodged a Bullet" | 2025 | — | — | — | — | — | — | — | — | — | | Non-album singles |
| "Keep Swinging" | 2025 | — | — | — | — | — | — | — | — | — | | Non-album singles |
| "Stars" | 2025 | — | — | — | — | — | — | — | — | — | | Non-album singles |
| "Hive" | 2026 | — | — | — | — | — | — | — | — | — | | Non-album singles |
"—" denotes a recording that did not chart or was not released in that territory.

== Music videos ==
List of music videos
| Title | Year | Director(s) |
|---|---|---|
| "Addicted" | 2008 | Anthony Honn |
| "18 Days" | 2009 | Travis Kopach |
| "Drowning (Face Down)" | 2009 | Shaun Silva |
| "Stupid Girl (Only in Hollywood)" | 2010 | Wayne Isham |
| "Bringing Down the Giant" | 2012 | Kevin J. Custer |
| "Mystify" | 2013 | Davo |
| "Blood Stained Revolution" | 2014 | Justin Escue |
| "15 Minutes of Fame" | 2016 | Denver Cavins and Ryan Conley |
| "Counting Stars" | 2023 | Drake Whelton |
| "Baptize Me" | 2023 | Unknown |
| "Fire" | 2023 | J. Austin Dellamano |
| "Dodged a Bullet" | 2025 | J. Austin Dellamano |
| "Keep Swinging" | 2025 | J. Austin Dellamano |
| "Stars" | 2025 | J. Austin Dellamano |
