= Mystify =

Mystify may refer to:

== In Film ==
- Mystify: Michael Hutchence, a 2019 documentary about the life of Michael Hutchence, lead singer of INXS.

== In Music ==
- Mystify: A Musical Journey with Michael Hutchence, a 2019 album by Michael Hutchence.
- "Mystify" (song), 1989 single by INXS
- "Mystify" (Saving Abel song), a 2013 single
- Mystify, a song by Raven-Symoné from This Is My Time, 2004

== See also ==
- Mystification (disambiguation)
- Mystified (disambiguation)
- Mysticism
