= Drowning (Face Down) =

Single by Saving Abel

from the album Saving Abel
- Released: March 9, 2009
- Recorded: 2007
- Genre: Post-grunge
- Length: 3:55 (album version); 3:37 (rock radio edit)
- Label: Virgin
- Songwriters: Skidd Mills; Jason Null; Jared Weeks

Saving Abel singles chronology
"18 Days" (2008)	"Drowning (Face Down)" (2009)	"Stupid Girl (Only in Hollywood)" (2010)

Music video
- "Drowning (Face Down)" on YouTube

"Drowning (Face Down)" is the third single by the American rock band Saving Abel from their self-titled debut album. "Drowning (Face Down)" peaked number 24 on the Billboard Hot Modern Rock Tracks chart and number 3 on the Hot Mainstream Rock Tracks chart.

The music video was made on March 20, 2009, and was released on April 30. The video was shot in part at A2 Wind Tunnel, in Mooresville, North Carolina. The video features former NASCAR owner–driver Jeremy Mayfield, with cameos by drivers Carl Edwards, Clint Bowyer, Martin Truex Jr., and Brian Vickers.

== Charts ==
=== Weekly charts ===
Weekly chart performance for "Drowning (Face Down)"
Chart (2009)	Peak position
Canada Rock (Billboard)	16
US Hot Rock & Alternative Songs (Billboard)	10

=== Year-end charts ===
Year-end chart performance for "Drowning (Face Down)"
Chart (2009)	Position
US Hot Rock Songs (Billboard)	43

== Release history ==
Release dates and formats for "Drowning (Face Down)"
Region	Date	Format(s)	Label	Ref.
United States	March 9, 2009	Active rock radio	Virgin	
United States	March 23, 2009	Alternative radio	Virgin	
United States	May 5, 2009	Digital download (rock radio edit)	Virgin	
