= Stupid Girl =

Stupid Girl may refer to:

- "Stupid Girl" (Rolling Stones song), 1966
- "Stupid Girl", a 1975 song by Neil Young & Crazy Horse from the album Zuma
- "Stupid Girl" (Garbage song), 1996
- "Stupid Girl" (Cold song), 2003
- "Stupid Girls", a 2006 single by Pink from the album I'm Not Dead
- "Stupid Girl (Only In Hollywood)", a 2010 single by Saving Abel
- "You Stupid Girl", a 2010 single by Framing Hanley from the album A Promise to Burn
