= Kevin James Custer =

American music video director (born 1971)

- Born: November 1971 (age 54–55); New York City, U.S.

Kevin James Custer is an American Business and Media Executive with credits that span television, film, commercial, print and multimedia platforms. Kevin has produced, directed, and/or edited projects for clients that include MTV, BET, FUSE, Sony, DefJam, E1, The Clinton Global Initiative, The United Nations, UNICEF, P&G, Ford, Disney, Discovery Channel, Animal Planet, Peloton, Flywheel, Echelon, and more.

Kevin also earned an MBA in Finance and Management and spent 8 years with management consulting firm McKinsey & Company where he designed international investment strategies & compensation models; financial risk/leverage models; foreign exchange/hedging strategies; global (multi-user, multi-bank, multi-currency) Treasury system.

As Executive Director, Kevin helped build the Peloton connected fitness streaming platform / business. He also helped build and grow the Flywheel at-home streaming business and was Executive Director and General Manager. He is Chief Content Officer for Echelon Fitness Multimedia.

== Documentary films directed and/or edited ==
- Finding the Funk – director Nelson George, editor Kevin J. Custer - featuring Questlove, Mike D, Bootsy Collins, Sly Stone, and more
- Apocalyptica - "Theme And Variations" – director & editor Kevin J Custer - featuring Lars Ulrich, Corey Taylor, Max Cavalera, Michael Monroe, and more
- 30 for 30 – director Nelson George, editor Kevin J Custer - featuring Walt "Clyde" Frazier
- Slayer - "25 Years Later - Madison Square Garden" – director & editor Kevin J Custer - 25 years after the show that destroyed The Felt Forum in NYC (MSG), Slayer returns to the Garden to perform and recount that epic night.
- MOOGFEST – director Kevin J Custer - Live at BB Kings, NYC featuring Jan Hammer, Keith Emerson, Bernie Worrell and more

== Television / web series directed and/or edited ==
- Discovery Channel - Shark Week 40th Anniversary
- Animal Planet - Meet The Irwins / Wild Times
- MTV Unplugged - Rita Ora
- MTV Unplugged - Walk The Moon
- MTV Headbangers Ball - Scandinavia - full season
- Disney - That's Fresh with Helen Cavalo - full season
- The Clinton Global Initiative 2010, 2011, 2012, 2013, 2015
- BET 2011 Black History Month spots

== Branded Content directed / edited ==
- Ford Motor Company
- Canon
- Weight Watchers
- P&G
- Disney
- Grand Cru
- Pampers
- Nicole Miller
- Hurley

== Music videos directed and edited ==
- 36 Crazyfists – "Swing the Noose"
- Alanis Morissette & Souleye – "Jekyll & Hyde"
- Anaka – "Deathborn"
- Anaka – "Erase"
- Angélique Kidjo – "You Can Count on Me"
- Angélique Kidjo f/Aṣa – "Eva"
- Angélique Kidjo f/John Legend & Bono – "Move on Up"
- Before the Mourning – "Another Sleepless Night"
- Beneath the Massacre – "Society's Disposable Son"
- Big Noyd – "Things Done Changed"
- Black Tusk – "Red Eyes, Black Skies"
- Cannibal Corpse – "Priests of Sodom"
- Chuck Ragan – "Non Typical"
- Dark Sermon – "Hounds"
- Decyfer Down – "Fight Like This"
- DJ Webstar & Jim Jones – "Dancin on Me"
- Fair to Midland – "Musical Chairs"
- Fake Problems – "Soulless"
- Hatebreed – "Ghosts of War"
- Hatebreed – "Thirsty and Miserable"
- High on Fire – "Frost Hammer"
- Highly Suspect – "Mom"
- Hunter Valentine – "Liar Liar"
- Kingdom of Sorrow – "Lead into Demise"
- Lacuna Coil – "I Like It"
- Last Chance to Reason – "SBTBATAC"
- Legion – "And Then, The Devil Said"
- Ligeia – "Beyond a Doubt"
- Madball – "Infiltrate the System"
- Method Man & Redman – "Mrs. International"
- Miss Fortune – "Chasing Dreams"
- Overkill – "Bitter Pill"
- Overkill – "The Armorist"
- Overkill – "Bring Me the Night"
- Overkill – "Electric Rattlesnake"
- Saving Abel – "Bringing Down The Giant"
- Shadows Fall – "The Unknown"
- Soulja Boy – "Donk"
- Sparks the Rescue – "Autumn"
- Subzero – "Lionhearted"
- System Divide – "The Apex Doctrine"
- Tesla – "So Divine"
- The Destro – "Beast Burden"
- The Gaslight Anthem – "American Slang"
- The Gaslight Anthem – "Great Expectations"
- The Gaslight Anthem – "The '59 Sound"
- The Horrible Crowes – "Behold the Hurricane"
- The Horrible Crowes – "Ladykiller"
- The Killing Gift – "Self Medicated"
- The Reverend Peyton's Big Damn Band – "Angels Look Like Devils"
- The Reverend Peyton's Big Damn Band – "Pot Roast and Kisses"
- The Reverend Peyton's Big Damn Band – "Raise a Little Hell"
- The Reverend Peyton's Big Damn Band – "Something For Nothing"
- The Reverend Peyton's Big Damn Band – "Clap Your Hands"
- The So So Glos – "Diss Town"
- The Stick People – "My Everything"
- Title Fight – "Shed"
- Tombs – "Gossamer"
- Too Late the Hero – "SCAIF"
- Within the Ruins – "Calling Card"
- Within the Ruins – "Feeding Frenzy"
- Within the Ruins – "Gods Amongst Men"
- Within the Ruins – "New Holy War"

== Live concert DVDs directed and edited ==
- Overkill – Live in Overhausen - DVD
- The Horrible Crowes – Live at the Troubadour, LA - DVD
- Flogging Molly – Live at The Greek Theater - DVD
- Hatebreed – Live Dominance - DVD

== Music videos edited ==
- The Sounds – "Yeah Yeah Yeah"
- The Sounds – "The No No Song"
- Gym Class Heroes – "Index Down"
- Hatebreed – "In Ashes They Shall Reap"
- Jeremy Greene featuring Pitbull – "Rain"
- Jim Jones – "Blow the Bank"
- Jim Jones – "Nana na na Nana"
- Jim Jones – "Pop Champaigne"
- Justin Bieber & Usher – "One Time"
- Ray J – "Gifts"
- Straight Line Stitch – "Remission"
- Straight Line Stitch – "Black Veil"
- Testament – "More Than Meets the Eye"
- The Warriors – "Destroying Cenodoxus"
- Threat Signal – "Through My Eyes"
- Unk – "Show Out"
- Willie the Kid f/ Trey Songz – "Love for Money"
