= Best Song Ever (disambiguation) =

"Best Song Ever" is a 2013 single by One Direction.

Best Song Ever may also refer to:

- "Best Song Ever", a 2010 single by Katie Armiger from her album Confessions of a Nice Girl
- "Give Me Your Hand (Best Song Ever)", a song by The Ready Set
- "The Best Song Ever Written", a song by Captain Howdy
