= Miss America (Saving Abel song) =

Single by Saving Abel

from the album Miss America
- Released: March 1, 2011
- Recorded: 2009–2010
- Genre: Hard rock; post-grunge
- Length: 3:40 (album version); 3:18 (radio mix)
- Label: Virgin
- Songwriters: Jared Weeks; Jason Null; Skidd Mills; Marti Frederiksen
- Producers: Skidd Mills; Marti Frederiksen

Saving Abel singles chronology
"The Sex Is Good" (2010)	"Miss America" (2011)	"Bringing Down the Giant" (2012)

Lyric video
- "Miss America" on YouTube

"Miss America" is a song by the American rock band Saving Abel, released in 2011 as the third single from their second album Miss America (2010).

== Track listing ==
Digital single

1. "Miss America" (radio mix) — 3:18

== Charts ==
Chart (2011)	Peak position
US Hot Rock & Alternative Songs (Billboard)	36
US Mainstream Rock (Billboard)	14

== Release history ==
Region	Date	Format(s)	Label	Ref.
United States	March 1, 2011	Digital download (radio mix)	Virgin	
United States	March 7, 2011	Active rock radio	Virgin	
