= Time & Pressure =

Studio album by Devour the Day
- Released: May 7, 2013
- Genre: Alternative metal, hard rock, nu metal
- Length: 35:30
- Label: Fat Lady Music
- Producer: Skidd Mills

Devour the Day chronology
| Time & Pressure (2013) | S.O.A.R. (2016) |

Singles from Time & Pressure
- 1. "Good Man" Released: April 2, 2013; 2. "Move On" Released: February 25, 2014; 3. "Respect" Released: May 2014

Time & Pressure is the debut studio album by American rock band Devour the Day, which consists of former Egypt Central members Joey Walser and Blake Allison. The album was produced by Skidd Mills and was released on May 7, 2013 through Fat Lady Music. It was reissued in January 2014. The first single "Good Man" was released to radio on March 29, 2013 and for digital downloading on April 2, 2013.

== Track listing ==
| No. | Title | Length |
|---|---|---|
| 1. | "Respect" | 2:51 |
| 2. | "Good Man" | 3:31 |
| 3. | "Blackout" | 3:04 |
| 4. | "You and Not Me" | 3:07 |
| 5. | "Move On" | 3:04 |
| 6. | "Get Out of My Way" | 3:15 |
| 7. | "Oath" | 3:32 |
| 8. | "Reckless" | 2:48 |
| 9. | "Handshakes to Fist Fights" | 3:26 |
| 10. | "Crossroads" | 3:21 |
| 11. | "The Drifter" | 3:36 |

Re-released Edition
| No. | Title | Length |
|---|---|---|
| 12. | "Check Your Head" | 3:03 |
| 13. | "Good Man (Acoustic)" | 3:38 |

== Personnel ==
- Blake Allison - lead vocals, drums, guitars, piano, producer
- Joey Walser - guitars, bass, piano, synthesizers, backing vocals, producer
- Skidd Mills - producer, mixer
