= The Sex Is Good =

Single by Saving Abel

from the album Miss America
- Released: August 30, 2010
- Recorded: 2009–2010
- Genre: Hard rock; post-grunge
- Length: 3:31
- Label: Virgin
- Songwriters: Jared Weeks; Jason Null; Skidd Mills

Saving Abel singles chronology
"Stupid Girl (Only in Hollywood)" (2010)	"The Sex Is Good" (2010)	"Miss America" (2011)

Lyric video
- "The Sex Is Good" on YouTube

"The Sex Is Good" is a song by American rock band Saving Abel, released as the second single from their second studio album Miss America (2010).

== Charts ==
=== Weekly charts ===
Chart (2010–2011)	Peak position
Canada Rock (Billboard)	7
US Alternative Airplay (Billboard)	22
US Hot Rock & Alternative Songs (Billboard)	10
US Mainstream Rock (Billboard)	1

=== Year-end charts ===
Chart (2011)	Position
US Mainstream Rock (Billboard)	25

== Certifications ==
Region	Certification	Certified units/sales
United States (RIAA)	Gold	500,000^{‡}
^{‡} Sales+streaming figures based on certification alone.

== Release history ==
Region	Date	Format(s)	Label	Ref.
United States	August 30, 2010	Active rock radio	Virgin	
United States	September 7, 2010	Digital download	Virgin	
