= Skidd Mills =

American composer

- Born: March 10, 1967 (age 59); Tenneesse
- Genres: Hard rock; alternative metal; post-grunge; southern rock; christian rock; country rock; nu-metal
- Occupations: Musician; record producer; mixer; engineer; writer
- Instruments: Guitar; bass guitar; acoustic guitar; keyboards; drums; organ
- Works: Ardent Studios (1991-2001); 747 Studios (2001-2007); Skiddco Music (2009-present)
- Years active: 1991–present
- Publisher: Skiddco Music LLC
- Website: https://www.skiddcomusic.com/

Skidd Mills is a songwriter/producer based in Nashville, Tennessee. Skidd began his career at Ardent Studios in 1991. There he learned from the likes of John Hampton, Joe Hardy, Jim Dickinson, and Paul Ebersold. In 2001, Skidd left Ardent and started 747 Studios with fellow producer Paul Ebersold. It was there that Skiddco Music was started. In 2009, Skidd moved his operation to Nashville, where he has studios in Nolensville and on Music Row. Skidd has spent his career as a songwriter, producer, mixer, and engineer in rock, country, pop, blues and Christian music.

In 2006, Skidd started Skiddco Music LLC. The production company's first signing was Mississippi rock act Saving Abel. After developing and writing with the band, Skiddco Music teamed up with Virgin Records and released their first self-titled CD. The CD was certified gold, and the first single, "Addicted" sold over 2 million. Other acts on Skiddco Music include Jared Blake, Billy Dawson, Ashla Taylor and Jared Weeks.

== Awards ==
Skidd has won multiple Grammy Awards along with having seven Grammy nominations. In 2010, Skidd won a BMI Pop Award for "most played song" for co-writing Saving Abel's "Addicted". Skidd has multiple Dove nominations.

== Selected discography ==
- Skillet – Collide (2003) *Grammy nominated
- Sister Hazel – Lift (2004)
- Saliva – Survival of the Sickest (2005)
- Third Day – Wire (2005) *Grammy winner
- Rev Theory – Truth Is Currency (2005)
- Kutless – Strong Tower (2005)
- Deepfield – Archetypes and Repetition (2006)
- 12 Stones – Anthem for the Underdog (2007)
- Submersed – Immortal Verses (2007)
- Saving Abel – Saving Abel (2008)
- Pillar – Confessions (2009)
- Sick Puppies – Tri-Polar (2009)
- Decyfer Down - Crash (2009) *Grammy nominated
- Tetanus – Such a Loser (2010)
- Saving Abel – Miss America (2010)
- Since October – Life, Scars, Apologies (2010)
- Taddy Porter – Taddy Porter (2010)
- Brent James & the Contraband - Moment of Silence (2011)
- Egypt Central – White Rabbit (2011)
- Madam Adam – Madam Adam (2011)
- Pop Evil - War of Angels (2011)
- 12 Stones - Only Human (2012)
- Charm City Devils - Sins (2012)
- Cavo - Thick as Thieves (2012)
- Saving Abel - Bringing Down the Giant (2012)
- 12 Stones - Beneath the Scars (2012)
- We as Human - We as Human (2013) *Dove nominated
- The Letter Black - Rebuild (2013)
- Katie Armiger - Fall Into Me (2013)
- Devour the Day - Time & Pressure (2013)
- Texas Hippie Coalition - Ride On (2014)
- Charm City Devils - Battles (2014)
- Jared Blake - 'Til Morning Light (2014)
- Saving Abel - Crackin' the Safe (2014)
- Art of Dying - Rise Up (2015)
- Flaw - Divided We Fall (Co-producer with Rick Lander)
- 12 Stones - Picture Perfect (2017)
