= Bringing Down the Giant =

Studio album by Saving Abel
- Released: July 17, 2012
- Recorded: 2012
- Genres: Hard rock; post-grunge
- Length: 44:55
- Label: eOne
- Producer: Skidd Mills

Saving Abel chronology
Miss America (2010)	Bringing Down the Giant (2012)	Blood Stained Revolution (2014)

Singles from Bringing Down the Giant
- 1. "Bringing Down the Giant" Released: May 14, 2012

Bringing Down the Giant is the third studio album by the American rock band Saving Abel and was released on July 17, 2012. It debuted and peaked at number 74 on the Billboard 200 chart. It was the last album to feature original lead singer Jared Weeks before his departure from the band at the end of 2013.

== Background ==
After touring non-stop since "Addicted" became hit in 2008 and writing their second album Miss America practically while on the road, Saving Abel took six months off to write their third album. In the writing sessions for the new album, the band avoided any sort of restrictions; the only rule was that the song had to be good and after that, it didn't matter what genre the song fell into. The time off between the road and the studio also enabled the group to take a step back and reflect before beginning work on new material, something the band was never given the time to do before recording Miss America.

"We toured so many places in such a short amount of time and it really did us some good as far as writing goes. It's great to be able to actually step away for a minute and think about what you want to do, what you want to represent, and who you want to become. Once we got that figured out, we just sat in the studio and did one thing, and that was we didn't argue – if a song was good then it was good. It didn't matter if it was Christian, Country, Pop…I think that's one of the things that's going to show through on this album once you listen to it. You will see how versatile it is and how many different genres there are. It's just something we're all really proud of".

For the album, Saving Abel teamed up again with producer Skidd Mills who has now worked with the band on each of their three records. In addition to Mills, the band also brought in rock producer Marti Frederiksen to provide a new perspective to the writing process.

Despite the success of Miss America, Virgin didn't pick up the option for third album, leaving the band looking for another label. Shortly thereafter, the band signed on to eOne, to release Bringing Down the Giant. The Saving Abel frontman Jared Weeks told to Alternative Addiction later: "It was one of those moments where they were as glad to sign us as we were to be signed. They came in and did about eight months of work in only two months; they supported us, gave us everything we needed to get going and get back out on the road".

However, the relationship with eOne ended by the end of 2012, due to 'lack of commitment' from the label, according to Weeks, who stated in November 2013: "The last album we had, our label didn't even promote it. A lot of people didn't even know we had a third album". Shortly after, Weeks announced his departure from the band.

== Promotion ==
The first single off the album was "Bringing Down the Giant". It was premiered exclusively at Loudwire website on May 14, 2012. An anti-bullying music video, shot at Alcorn Central schools in the band's hometown Corinth, Mississippi, was directed by Kevin J. Custer and produced by Tim Gray. The song reached No. 37 on the US Billboard Rock charts.

== Reception ==
Professional ratings
Review scores
Source	Rating
AllMusic	2.5/5 stars
Evigshed	(5/5)
Melodic.net	3.5/5 stars
Pop-Break	mixed
QRO	(6.7/10)
Sea of Tranquility	3/5 stars

The album received mixed reviews from professional critics.

== Track listing ==
Bringing Down the Giant
No.	Title	Writer(s)	Length
1.	"Bringing Down the Giant"	Blair Daly; Skidd Mills; Jason Null; Jared Weeks	3:53
2.	"Michael Jackson's Jacket"	Daly; Mills; Null; Weeks	3:31
3.	"Amazing"	Marti Frederiksen; Mills; Null; Weeks	3:24
4.	"Pine Mountain (The Dance of the Poor Proud Man)" (interlude)		1:15
5.	"You Make Me Sick"	Mills; Null; Weeks	3:31
6.	"Pictures of Elvis"	Frederiksen; Mills; Null; Weeks	3:53
7.	"New Loser"	Frederiksen; Mills; Null; Weeks	3:23
8.	"Me and You"	Mills; Null; Weeks	3:20
9.	"I'd Do It Again"	Rodney Clawson; Mills; Null; Weeks	3:28
10.	"Bittersweet"	Frederiksen; Mills; Null; Weeks	3:34
11.	"Those Who Wait"	Mills; Null; Weeks	3:39
12.	"Parachute"	Mills; Null; Weeks	3:32
13.	"Constantly"	Scott Bartlett; Mills; Null; Weeks	4:39
Total length:			44:55

Best Buy exclusive bonus tracks
No.	Title	Writer(s)	Length
14.	"Take It Back"	Bobby Huff; Mills; Null; Weeks	4:01
15.	"Love Sadistic"	Mark Holman; Mills; Null; Weeks	3:45
16.	"My Catastrophe"	Mills; Null; Weeks	3:45

== Chart positions ==
Chart (2012)	Peak position
US Billboard 200	74
US Top Rock Albums (Billboard)	25
US Independent Albums (Billboard)	17
US Top Alternative Albums (Billboard)	15

== Personnel ==
- Jared Weeks – lead vocals
- Jason Null – lead guitar
- Scott Bartlett – rhythm guitar, backing vocals
- Eric Taylor – bass
- Mike McManus – drums
