= Life, Scars, Apologies =

Studio album by Since October
- Released: June 8, 2010
- Genre: Alternative metal, nu metal
- Length: 41:01
- Label: Tooth & Nail
- Producer: Travis Wyrick, Skidd Mills, Brandon Ebel

Since October chronology
This Is My Heart (2008)	Life, Scars, Apologies (2010)

Singles from Life, Scars, Apologies
- 1. "The Show" Released: 2010; 2. "The Way You Move" Released: 2010

Professional ratings
Review scores
Source	Rating
Jesus Freak Hideout	2.5/5 stars

Life, Scars, Apologies is the second full-length studio album by alternative metal band Since October. The album was released on June 8, 2010, through Tooth & Nail Records, their second for the label.

== Track listing ==
No.	Title	Length
1.	"The Way You Move"	3:33
2.	"Life, Scars, Apologies"	3:24
3.	"Believe"	3:26
4.	"Sober Love"	3:10
5.	"Life of Mine"	3:57
6.	"Other Side of Me"	3:58
7.	"The Show"	2:28
8.	"Mend All the Pieces"	3:31
9.	"Crying Shame"	2:50
10.	"My Only"	3:17
11.	"Made Up My Mind"	3:18
12.	"Don't Follow" (Alice in Chains cover)	4:09
Total length:		41:01

Deluxe edition bonus tracks
No.	Title	Length
13.	"Leave My Mark"	3:34
14.	"Life of Mine" (acoustic)	3:07
15.	"Guilty" (acoustic)	4:04

== Members ==
- Ben Graham – lead vocals
- Luke Graham – guitar, backing vocals
- Josh Johnson – bass guitar, backing vocals
- Audie Grantham – drums, screaming vocals
