= Don't Let Go (Love) =

1996 single by En Vogue

Single by En Vogue

from the album EV3 and Set It Off soundtrack
- Released: October 22, 1996
- Genre: R&B
- Length: 4:52 (album version); 4:04 (radio edit)
- Label: EastWest
- Songwriters: Andrea Martin; Ivan Matias; Marqueze Ethridge; Organized Noize
- Producers: Organized Noize; Ivan Matias

En Vogue singles chronology
"Whatta Man" (1993)	"Don't Let Go (Love)" (1996)	"Whatever" (1997)

Music video
- "Don't Let Go (Love)" on YouTube

"Don't Let Go (Love)" is a song by American R&B group En Vogue. It was produced by Organized Noize and Ivan Matias for the Set It Off soundtrack (1996), also appearing on the group's third album, EV3 (1997). It was released to radio on September 23, 1996, and issued as a single on October 22 by EastWest Records. The song was the group's last single and music video (directed by Matthew Rolston) to feature member Dawn Robinson and was En Vogue's biggest international single, making it to the top 10 in several countries. According to Billboard magazine, the single was the 83rd-most-successful single of the 1990s in the United States.

== Background ==
"Don't Let Go (Love)" was written by Andrea Martin, Ivan Matias, and Marqueze Ethridge along with Organized Noize members Sleepy Brown, Rico Wade, and Ray Murray, while production was by Organized Noize. According to Ivan, the song was originally written for American rock band Aerosmith. Martin and him were rather surprised when Elektra Records president Sylvia Rhone hired them to record it with the quartet after she had heard their demo. In 2012, he disclosed: "Sylvia heard something we couldn't. Andrea ordered me to get into that studio and cut those vocals anyway — while she went to get her nails done. It was then that we employed the 'you like it, we love it' outlook."

Vocal production was supervised by Matias. Dawn Robinson sings the entire lead while Maxine Jones performs the bridge. Cindy Herron performs a verse to the bridge. Terry Ellis sings outro lyrics in the music video version and "Fulton Yard Mix". Martin Terry and Tommy Martin played the guitars on the song, while drums were played by Lil' John. Marvin "Chanz" Parkman played the grand piano. The song compelled Elektra mogul Sylvia Rhone to place En Vogue back in the studio to record their EV3 project for release in 1997. While the other group members plus the record producers and label executives were focused on the new En Vogue album, Dawn Robinson wanted to pursue a solo career. Forced to choose between the group or her solo project, Robinson decided to leave En Vogue for a recording deal with Dr. Dre's Aftermath Records. The turn of events following the success of the song was the beginning of a long and tumultuous era for En Vogue as member changes became quite frequent.

== Critical reception ==
AllMusic editor Stephen Thomas Erlewine described the song as "yearning". Larry Flick from Billboard magazine called it a "bluesy interlude", and commented further that the harmonies are "instantly recognizable, flexing sweetly over the track's live funk beat and snaky guitar licks. If you're looking for a duplication of past hits, forget it. This is a far more musically mature effort that will appeal to both street and sophisticated tastes." J.D. Considine from Entertainment Weekly wrote in his review of EV3, "No surprise, then, that although the women get top billing, the arrangements are the real stars. 'Don't Let Go (Love)' is the most obvious example, since the interplay between lead and background vocals is as disciplined as it is dramatic." Another EW editor, David Grad, noted its "combination of sensual harmonies and sultry attitude", and deemed it as a "provocative little offering". Dave Ferman from Fort Worth Star-Telegram said the song is "hauntingly lush", and that it "finds the singers' voices ebbing and flowing like the ocean on a threatening day." A reviewer from Music Week gave it four out of five, stating that "the girls let rip with a swoonsome, powerful single" and a "positive taster" for a spring album, that "should please fans and ensure they attract a few more."

Gerald Martinez from New Straits Times called it "dramatic", noting that "this song has all the punch, power and stunning voices in harmony that one has come to expect from En Vogue." Rebecca Schiller from NME said the group's performance "was gutsy and full of knowing gravitas." Another NME editor, John Mulvey, stated that the single "retains a frankly terrifying power". A reviewer for People Magazine wrote that it is "still smoldering", noting the song's "tough sound", and naming it the highlight of EV3. Elysa Gardner from Rolling Stone described it as an "even more aggressive tune", and added that the "slow-burning" track "promote[s] romantic and carnal abandon, advising lovers to proceed without caution." Laura Jamison from Salon Magazine noted it as a "tempestuous" and "sexy" single. Ann Powers from Spin called it a "cry for a lover's loyalty that En Vogue convert into a nonnegotiable demand". She complimented the song as their "highest achievement" on EV3. Ian Hyland from Sunday Mirror commented, "The hit singles 'Whatever' and 'Don't Let Go' may well be brilliant but they only add more spice to a mighty fine collection."

== Commercial performance ==
"Don't Let Go (Love)" became the third En Vogue track to peak at number two on the U.S. Billboard Hot 100, where it was the group's sixth and final Top 10 hit. It also peaked at number two on the U.S. Mainstream Top 40 and ranks at number 43 on its all-time chart. The song was a number-one R&B song for one week, becoming En Vogue's sixth and final number-one R&B hit. It reached number five in the UK in early 1997 and spent 13 weeks in the UK top 40, eight of them in the top 10. The single re-entered the UK chart at number 23 in 2011 after girl group Little Mix performed the song in "Movies" week on the eighth series of the British television singing competition, The X Factor, on November 19, 2011. NME ranked the song number 127 in their list of the "150 Best Tracks Of The Past 15 Years" in 2011. The En Vogue hit reached number 23 on the UK chart and in Ireland, it also returned to the charts at number 50. In 1997, the song went to number one on the Norwegian top 20 singles chart (VG-Lista Topp 20) and stayed there for six consecutive weeks. In total, it was in the top 20 for 16 weeks. The single sold 1.3 million copies in the United States and was certified platinum by the RIAA.

== Music video ==
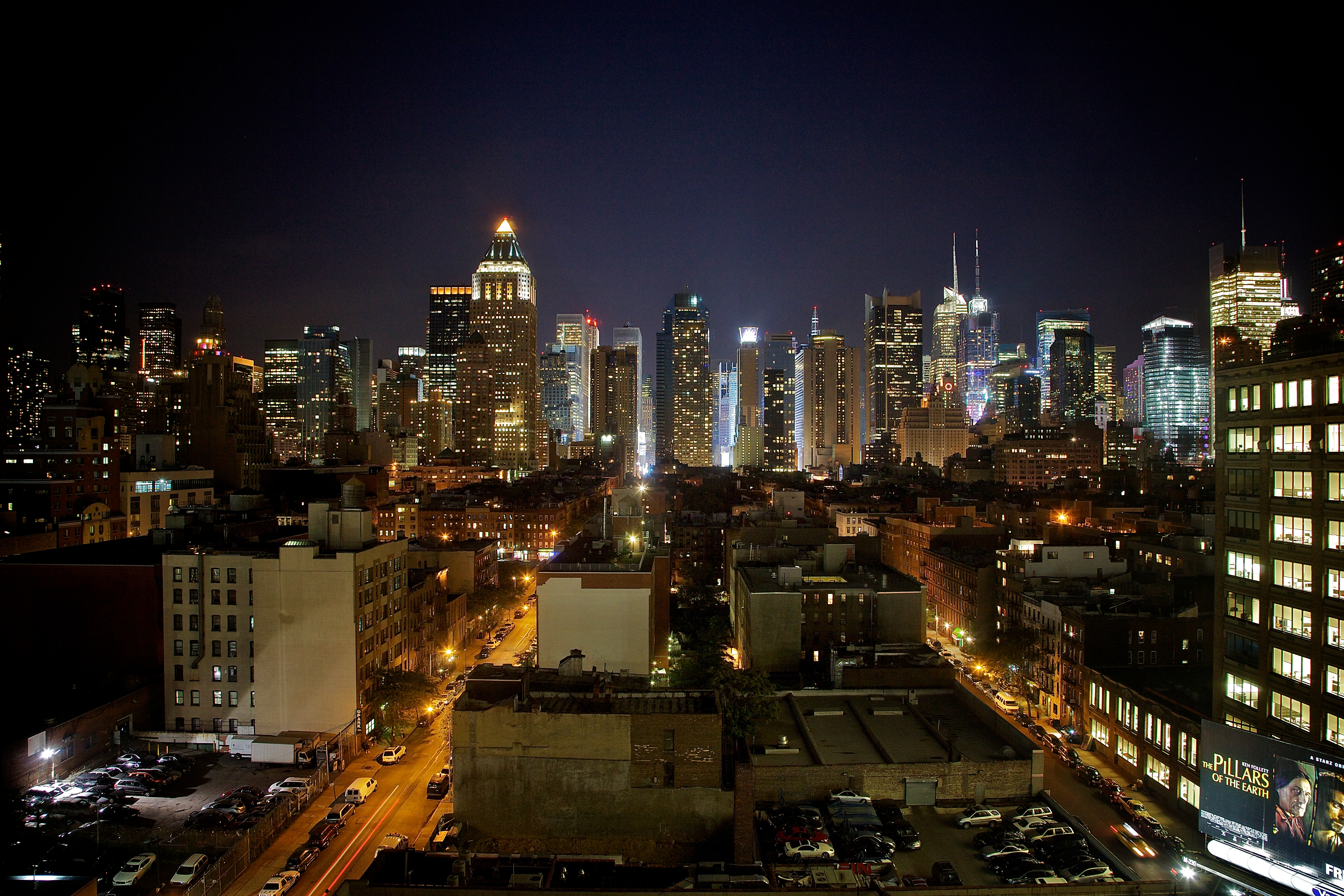
Unlike the film Set It Off, which was set in Los Angeles, California, the music video for "Don't Let Go (Love)" was set in New York City.

The music video for "Don't Let Go (Love)" was directed by Matthew Rolston under the Alan Smithee pseudonym. It was En Vogue's third collaboration with Rolston following "My Lovin' (You're Never Gonna Get It)" and "Whatta Man".

The video shows En Vogue singing in front of an audience are dressed in black outfits while some clips of Set It Off are inserted. A second music video was released using the same footage of all four band members singing in front of an audience, but the scenes from Set It Off are replaced with images that followed a new storyline. In this version, Mekhi Phifer plays a man who has been secretly cheating all four band members. The four women find out about each other and confront Phifer's character through their performance at the party.

== Legacy ==
In October 2011, NME ranked "Don't Let Go (Love)" number 127 on its list "150 Best Tracks of the Past 15 Years". In 2017, Billboard magazine ranked it number 62 in their "The 100 Greatest Pop Songs of 1997". In 2018, Stacker ranked it number 43 in their list of "Best Pop Songs of the Last 25 Years". In 2019, Elle ranked it number 32 in their list of "52 Best 1990s Pop Songs" In 2026, Billboard ranked it number 50 in their "The Biggest No. 2 Hot 100 Hits of All Time" list, noting that the song had peaked at number two, just behind Toni Braxton's "Un-Break My Heart".

== Awards and nominations ==
Year	Award	Result
1997	Grammy Award for Best R&B Vocal Performance by a Duo or Group	Nominated
1997	Soul Train Lady of Soul Award for Best R&B, Rap or Soul Single by Group, Band or Duo	Won
1997	Billboard Music Award for Top Soundtrack Single	Nominated

== Charts ==
=== Weekly charts ===
Chart (1996–1997)	Peak position
Australia (ARIA)	3
Austria (Ö3 Austria Top 40)	9
Belgium (Ultratop 50 Flanders)	4
Belgium (Ultratop 50 Wallonia)	4
Canada (Nielsen SoundScan)	5
Canada Top Singles (RPM)	23
Denmark (IFPI)	1
Estonia Airplay (Eesti Top 15)	1
Europe (Eurochart Hot 100)	5
Finland (Suomen virallinen lista)	8
France (SNEP)	14
Germany (GfK)	7
Iceland (Íslenski Listinn Topp 40)	13
Ireland (IRMA)	3
Israel (Israeli Singles Chart)	4
Netherlands (Dutch Top 40)	2
Netherlands (Single Top 100)	2
New Zealand (Recorded Music NZ)	10
Norway (VG-lista)	1
Scottish Singles Sales (Official Charts)	12
Sweden (Sverigetopplistan)	6
Switzerland (Schweizer Hitparade)	4
UK Singles (Official Charts)	5
UK Airplay (Music Week)	3
UK Dance (Official Charts)	9
UK Hip Hop/R&B (Official Charts)	1
US Adult Pop Airplay (Billboard)	16
US Billboard Hot 100	2
US Dance Singles Sales (Billboard)	6
US Hot R&B/Hip-Hop Songs (Billboard)	1
US Pop Airplay (Billboard)	2
US Rhythmic Airplay (Billboard)	1
US Cash Box Top 100	3

Chart (2011)	Peak position
Ireland (IRMA)	36
Scottish Singles Sales (Official Charts)	33
UK Singles (Official Charts)	23
UK Hip Hop/R&B (Official Charts)	6

=== Year-end charts ===
Chart (1996)	Position
US Top 40/Mainstream (Billboard)	85
US Top 40/Rhythm-Crossover (Billboard)	69

Chart (1997)	Position
Australia (ARIA)	18
Belgium (Ultratop 50 Flanders)	24
Belgium (Ultratop 50 Wallonia)	31
Europe (Eurochart Hot 100)	12
France (SNEP)	75
Germany (Media Control)	29
Iceland (Íslenski Listinn Topp 40)	78
Netherlands (Dutch Top 40)	16
Netherlands (Single Top 100)	37
Norway (VG-lista)	16
Romania (Romanian Top 100)	37
Sweden (Topplistan)	43
Switzerland (Schweizer Hitparade)	5
UK Singles (OCC)	29
UK Airplay (Music Week)	6
US Billboard Hot 100	7
US Adult Top 40 (Billboard)	37
US Hot R&B Singles (Billboard)	12
US Rhythmic Top 40 (Billboard)	5
US Top 40/Mainstream (Billboard)	6

=== Decade-end charts ===
Chart (1990–1999)	Position
US Billboard Hot 100	83

== Certifications ==
Region	Certification	Certified units/sales
Australia (ARIA)	Gold	35,000^{^}
Belgium (BRMA)	Gold	25,000^{*}
Germany (BVMI)	Gold	250,000^{^}
Netherlands (NVPI)	Gold	50,000^{^}
New Zealand (RMNZ)	Platinum	30,000^{‡}
Norway (IFPI Norway)	Platinum	
Switzerland (IFPI Switzerland)	Gold	25,000^{^}
United Kingdom (BPI)	Platinum	600,000^{‡}
United States (RIAA)	Platinum	1,300,000
^{*} Sales figures based on certification alone.^{^} Shipments figures based on certification alone.^{‡} Sales+streaming figures based on certification alone.

== Release history ==
Region	Date	Format(s)	Label(s)	Ref(s).
United States	September 24, 1996	Rhythmic contemporary; contemporary hit radio	EastWest	
United States	October 22, 1996	12-inch vinyl; CD; cassette	EastWest	
United Kingdom	December 30, 1996	12-inch vinyl; CD; cassette	EastWest	
Japan	January 15, 1998	CD	EastWest	

== Other versions ==
- On March 11, 2011, South Korean girl group Bella covered their song for their debut single Don't Let Go.
- On November 19, 2011, girl-group contestant Little Mix performed the song for "Movies" week on the eighth series of the British television talent contest The X Factor, leading to En Vogue's version re-entering the UK chart at number 23. In the finals, Little Mix performed the song for a second time and they won the show on December 11. The song is a bonus track on the group's winner's single, "Cannonball". Following the group's win and their single, the song re-entered the charts again a few weeks later at number 27.
- On 2014 British band The Brand New Heavies covered the song in their album Sweet Freaks.
- US girl group Good Girl covered the song on America's Got Talent in the year of 2016.
- British house music producer James Hype released a cover of the song titled "More Than Friends", with vocals by South London-based artist Kelli-Leigh. "More Than Friends" peaked number eight on the UK Singles Chart in August 2017.
- Australian singer Greg Gould teamed up with En Vogue founding member Maxine Jones with a duet ballad version in 2017.
- In 2018, singers Kelsea Johnson and Jordyn Simone performed the song during the Battle rounds on the 14th season of The Voice.
- Rock group Deepfield covered the song for their debut album Archetypes and Repetition.

== See also ==
- List of number-one R&B singles of 1997 (U.S.)
- List of number-one hits in Norway
