= Mystified =

Mystified may refer to:

- Mystified (EP), a 2017 EP by Joe Scarborough
- Mystified (film), a 2019 Philippine fantasy film
- Mystified, a 1997 album by Shahram Nazeri
- "Mystified", a song on the 1987 album Dear Children by The Black Sorrows
- "Mystified", a song on the 1987 album Tango In The Night by Fleetwood Mac
- "Mystified", a song on the 2003 album Neon Nights by Dannii Minogue

== See also ==
- Mystify (disambiguation)
