= Garfield Redden =

Background information
- Also known as: Garf Redden
- Born: February 24, 1974 (age 52)
- Genres: Hard rock; alternative rock
- Occupation: Drummer
- Instrument: Drums
- Member of: Saving Abel
- Formerly of: One Day Alive; Tommy Tutone

Garfield Redden (born February 24, 1974) is an American rock drummer. He is the drummer for the band Saving Abel and One Day Alive, and has performed with Tommy Tutone.

== Career ==
=== One Day Alive ===
Redden is the drummer for the Cincinnati-based rock band One Day Alive. In a 2022 feature, Go Venue Magazine identified Redden as the band’s drummer and discussed the group’s touring activity and musical direction during his tenure.

=== Saving Abel ===
By 2025, Redden became the touring drummer for Saving Abel.

A review published by 1013 Music Reviews covering Saving Abel’s performance at the Pablo Center in Eau Claire, Wisconsin, named Redden as the band’s drummer and noted his participation alongside the group’s longtime members.

== Musical style ==
In interviews, Redden has described his drumming approach as performance-focused and rooted in hard rock and alternative rock traditions, emphasizing live energy and groove.

== Discography ==
This section lists recordings credited to bands during Redden’s tenure where independent sourcing confirms his involvement.

=== With One Day Alive ===
- One Day Alive – studio releases and singles (drums)

=== With Saving Abel ===
- Live performances and touring appearances (2025)
