= Deepfield =

American rock band

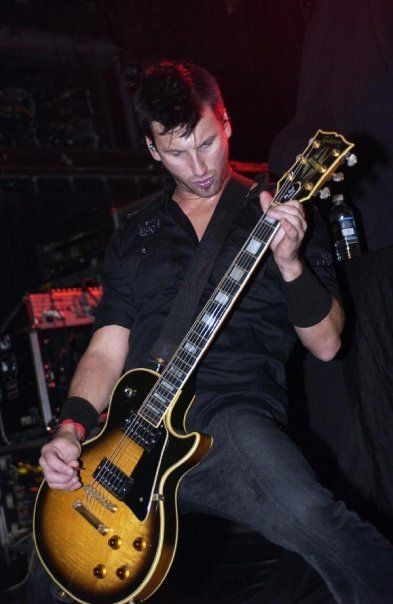
- Lead singer Baxter Teal III. in 2010

Background information
- Origin: Charleston, South Carolina, U.S.
- Genres: Rock; Post-Grunge
- Years active: 2005–2011; 2019–present
- Labels: In De Goot; Skiddco
- Members: Baxter Teal III; Jake Portenkirchner; Ken Becker; PJ Farley
- Past members: Aron Robinson; Eric Bass; Russell Lee; J. King; Dawson Huss; Sean Von Tersch; Brandon Spytma; Daniel Garvin; Jason Chapman; Ty Allyn

Deepfield (often stylized as deepfield) is an American rock band from Charleston, South Carolina, consisting of members Baxter Teal III, Jake Portenkirchner, Ken Becker and PJ Farley. They have released three albums and one EP.

The band is currently based in Chicago, Illinois.

== History ==
=== Formation (2005–2007) ===
Deepfield was formed in Charleston, South Carolina in 2005 by Baxter Teal, Eric Bass (now the bassist for Shinedown), Russell Lee (drums) and J. King (original bass player, moved over to guitar when Bass left the band to pursue producing and recording). The band's name came from the image of space taken by the Hubble telescope in 1995. After shopping a three-song demo the band found themselves playing a showcase in New York, where they were promptly signed by industry legend Bill McGathy to his new label, In De Goot Recordings.

After being signed to In De Goot Records (Fontana/Universal) in 2006 and spending more than a year writing, the band took over 70 demos into the studio with producers Paul Ebersold and Skidd Mills (3 Doors Down, Saliva, Third Day, Skillet, Saving Abel), before releasing the 12 songs on their debut record, Archetypes and Repetition (2007).

Aron Robinson joined the band on the 2008 Cage Rattle Most Wanted Tour. PJ Farley joined the group in 2009 and is also the bassist for the rock band Ra (Universal). Sean Von Tersch joined the group in 2010.

=== Archetypes and Repetition (2007–2009) ===
The band released their debut record Archetypes and Repetition (Indegoot/Fontana/Universal) in 2007, touring the country extensively from 2007 to 2009 behind the singles "Get It" and "Into the Flood", the latter garnering "#1 phones" in several U.S. markets. Get It can often be heard as the intro music to The Howard Stern Show.

"Don't Let Go", a cover of the En Vogue original was never officially released yet still garnered radio play.

Deepfield supported the record on the road with Shinedown, Puddle of Mudd, Saliva, Chevelle, Saving Abel, Drowning Pool, Tantric, Nonpoint and The Exies.

=== Nothing Can Save Us Now and breakup (2010–2011) ===
Nothing Can Save Us Now was Deepfield's sophomore album, released December 6, 2011 through Skiddco Music label. The first single on the new album is the song "Nothing Left to Lose".

=== Return, The Acoustic Sessions and Postdiluvian (2019–present) ===
After disbanding in 2011, the band has returned in 2019, releasing the album "The Acoustic Sessions", that featured acoustic versions of older songs and some new ones, including the single "Halo". Among the new lineup is new lead guitarist Ken Becker and new drummer Jake Portenkirchner. On June 13, 2023, the band released a standalone single titled "Carousel".

The band released "And The Devil Sang" on October 17, 2024 as the first single from their upcoming third studio album "Postdiluvian", which is set to be released in 2025.

== Members ==
Current

- Baxter Teal – lead vocals, rhythm guitar (2005–2011, 2019–present)
- Jake Portenkirchner – drums, percussion (2019–present)
- Ken Becker – lead guitar, backing vocals (2019–present)
- PJ Farley – bass guitar, backing vocals (2009–2011, 2019–present)

Former

- Eric Bass – lead guitar (2005–2008)
- Russell Lee – drums (2005–2009)
- J. King – bass guitar (2005–2008), lead guitar (2008–2011)
- Aron Robinson – drums, percussion (2010–2011)
- Dawson Huss
- Sean Von Tersch – drums (2010)
- Brandon Spytma
- Daniel Garvin
- Jason Chapman

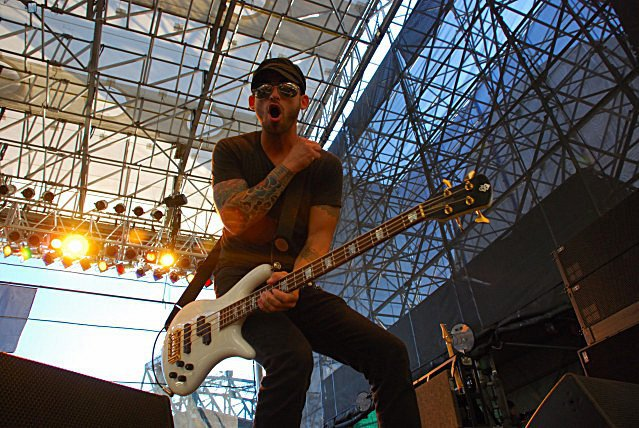
PJ Farley live in 2009

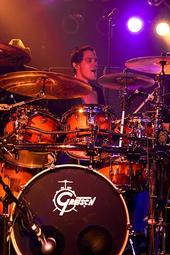
Aron Robinson in 2010

== Discography ==
Studio albums

- Archetypes and Repetition (2007)
- Nothing Can Save Us Now (2011)
- Postdiluvian (2025)

Compilations

- The Acoustic Sessions (2019)
