= Since October =

American Christian rock band

- Origin: Bradenton, Florida, US
- Genres: Christian alternative rock, nu metal
- Years active: 2005–present
- Label: Tooth & Nail
- Members: Ben Graham; Luke Graham; Josh Johnson; Audie Grantham
- Website: Label's Artist page

Since October is an American Christian alternative rock band from Bradenton, Florida.

== History ==
Since October was signed to Tooth & Nail Records in 2007. They sold over 5,000 copies of an independent release prior to signing to Tooth and Nail. Their second album, This Is My Heart, was released on May 27, 2008. The lead single from the album, "Guilty", reached No. 21 in the Hot Mainstream Rock Tracks chart. The band has also released a music video for the song "Disaster".

In early 2009, the band toured with Saliva, Pop Evil, Dead Season, and Aranda. They also made appearances on The Contagious Tour featuring Trapt, Red, Halestorm, and Inept.

In 2010, the band recorded their follow up album to This is My Heart, Life, Scars, Apologies, released on Tooth & Nail. "The Show", a song off the new album, was one of the official theme songs to Wrestlemania XXVI. Their first single, "The Way You Move", reached No. 14 on the Billboard Mainstream Rock charts and is now featured on ESPN for the entire college basketball season. The song is also available on Rock Band. The band toured all of 2010 with bands like Saliva, Halestorm, Adelitas Way, Saving Abel, Korn, Disturbed, Mudvayne, Papa Roach, and were featured on the Harddrive Live tour with Sevendust and 10 Years.

== Members ==
- Ben Graham – lead vocals
- Luke Graham – guitars, backing vocals
- Josh Johnson – bass, backing vocals
- Audie Grantham – drums, screamed vocals

== Discography ==
=== Studio albums ===
- 2006: Gasping for Hope - (Independent) 10 tracks. 8 tracks re-released on This Is My Heart
- 2008: This Is My Heart - (Tooth & Nail Records)
- 2010: Life, Scars, Apologies - (Tooth & Nail Records)

=== Singles ===
| Year | Song | Peak chart | Album | Released |
| Year | Song | US Main. | Album | Released |
|---|---|---|---|---|
| 2009 | "Disaster" | — | This Is My Heart | May 27, 2008 |
| 2009 | "Guilty" | 21 | This Is My Heart | May 27, 2008 |
| 2010 | "The Show" | — | Life, Scars, Apologies | June 8, 2010 |
| 2010 | "The Way You Move" | 20 | Life, Scars, Apologies | June 8, 2010 |
| 2011 | "Life of Mine" | — | Life, Scars, Apologies | June 8, 2010 |
| 2011 | "Believe" | — | Life, Scars, Apologies | June 8, 2010 |
