= Egypt Central =

American rock band

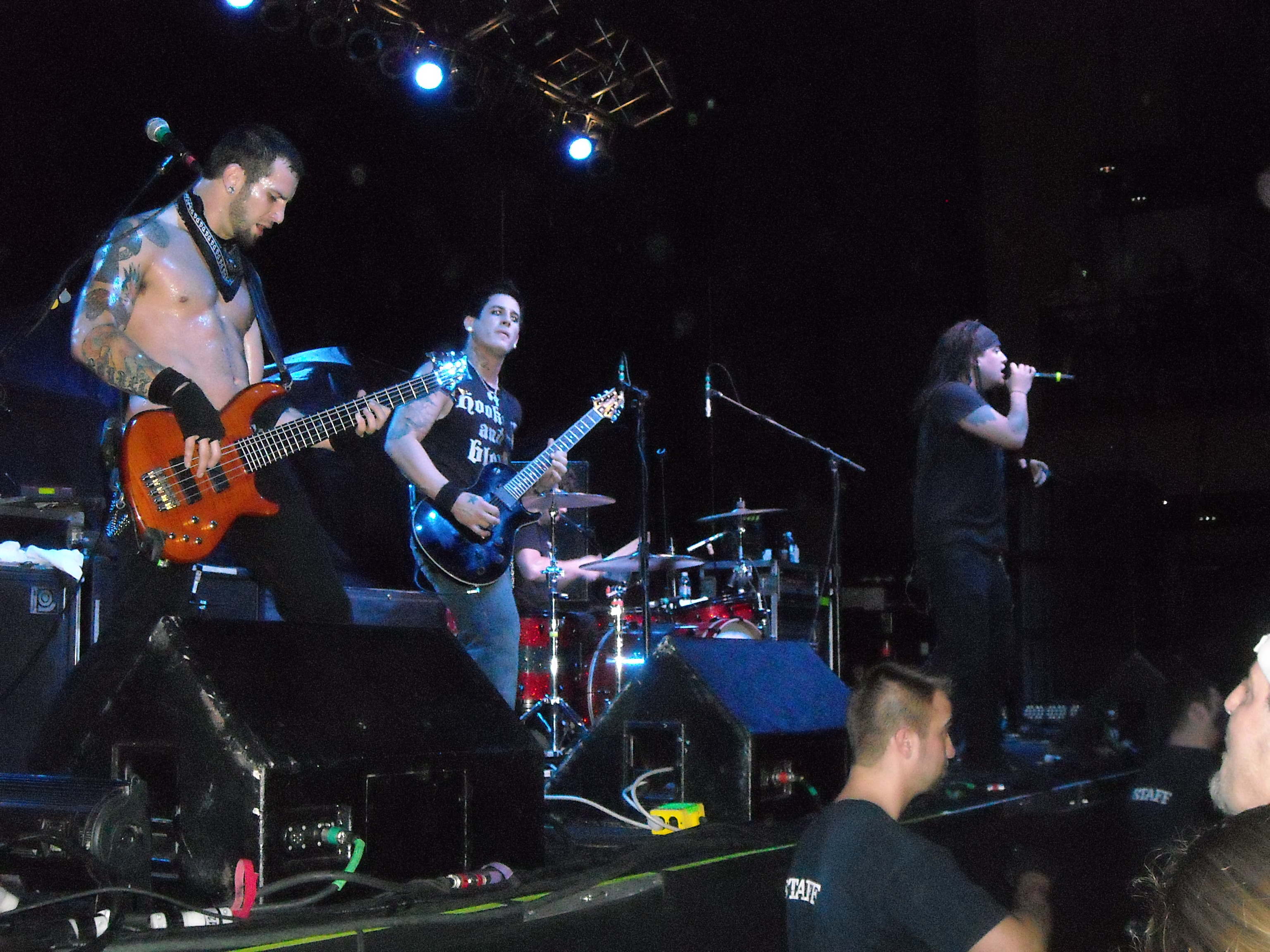
- Egypt Central performing in 2008

Background information
- Origin: Memphis, Tennessee, U.S.
- Genres: Alternative metal; nu metal; post-grunge; hard rock
- Years active: 2002–2012; 2019–present
- Labels: Lava, Atlantic, Bieler Bros. Records, Fat Lady Music, A Window In
- Members: John Falls; Blake Allison; Joey Chicago
- Past members: Michael Spann; Stephen "Worm" Williams; Jeff James; Chris D'Abaldo; Heath Hindman; Don Wray; Josie Cummings
- Website: www.egyptcentral.band

Egypt Central is an American rock band from Memphis, Tennessee.

== History ==
=== Formation and debut album (2002–2010) ===
Egypt Central was formed on October 2, 2002 in Memphis, Tennessee and named after one of its roads. They wrote and recorded for one year until generating a buzz in their hometown. After eight shows, they caught the attention of former Lava Records CEO Jason Flom. Flom offered the band a record deal after seeing their live performances. Egypt Central's self-titled debut album was recorded with producer Josh Abraham in Los Angeles. It experienced many delays, eventually being released by Fat Lady Music on January 15, 2008. Two singles were released to promote the album: "You Make Me Sick" and "Taking You Down". These two tracks also ended up being on the soundtrack of the video game WWE SmackDown vs. Raw 2009. They have performed with bands like Disturbed, Seether, Sevendust, Hurt, Red, In This Moment, and many others.

There is rumored to be an entire second album from this era which was never released due to legal issues with their record label. Two songs meant for this album, "Hate" and "California Dreams" (later reworked as "Citizen Radio" and released on the Murder in the French Quarter: Rare & Unreleased EP), were performed live while on tour in 2008.

=== White Rabbit (2010–2011) ===
Egypt Central completed work on their second studio album, entitled White Rabbit, in December 2010 with producer Skidd Mills and released it on May 31, 2011. The album received many positive reviews from many sources. The album's title track was released as the first single on March 1, 2011. The band toured from March–May on the Tour of the American Dream tour with Cold and Kopek. The band toured on their Down the Hole headlining tour with Abused Romance and Candlelight Red in June and with Burn Halo and Red Line Chemistry in July. In addition to several festival appearances, the band toured briefly with Hinder, Saving Abel, and Adelitas Way in August. The band supported Pop Evil on a number of shows in September followed by a supporting leg of shows with Hinder and The Red Jumpsuit Apparatus in October. The band opened for Staind at the Q103 Thanksgiving Hangover, November 26 at the Washington Avenue Armory in Albany New York. They then joined Puddle of Mudd and Pop Evil on December 9 for the 105.7 The X (WIXO) Nutcracker Eleven at the Expo Gardens in Peoria.

=== Breakup (2012–2019) ===
On December 3, 2012, after being inactive for a year, bassist Joey Chicago announced through a letter on Facebook that both vocalist John Falls and guitarist Jeff James would not be continuing on with the band, thus bringing an end to Egypt Central.

In 2014 a post was made to the band's Facebook page, announcing a new EP of previously unreleased songs titled Murder in the French Quarter, that was set for release on August 19, 2014.

=== Reunion & Burn With You (since 2019) ===
On April 1, 2019, a mysterious teaser video appeared on the band's Facebook page. The teaser appears to feature new music along with a cryptic 06 06 19 message. The video was re-posted on May 6, 2019. On June 6, 2019, Egypt Central released "Raise the Gates" as a new single confirming a reunion. On June 18, 2019, another cryptic teaser appeared on both Facebook and Instagram with a new date 07 05 19. On July 5, 2019, Egypt Central released "Dead Machine" on their YouTube channel. On April 13, 2020, Egypt Central released a new single "Over Soon" on all platforms. October 20, 2020, the band announced on their Instagram page the release of a new single "Hunted" set for November 20. Another single, "Let Me Out", was released digitally on April 30, 2021. An EP titled Burn With You was released on July 9, 2021. On December 5, 2021, the band released a new single, Beautiful Misery with rapper Mikes Dead. On February 22, 2022, the band announced a new single called No Place Like home with a date on their YouTube channel 3-10-22.

The band are confirmed to be making an appearance at Welcome to Rockville, which will take place in Daytona Beach, Florida in May 2026.

== Band members ==
=== Official members ===
- Blake Allison – Drums
- Joey "Chicago" Walser – Bass
- John Falls – Lead Vocals

=== Former members ===
- Heath Hindman – Lead Guitar
- Jeff James – Rhythm Guitar
- Don Wray – Lead Guitar (2001–2004)
- Stephen "Worm" Williams – Lead Guitar
- Chris D'Abaldo – Rhythm Guitar

== Discography ==
=== Studio albums ===
Year	Album details	Peak chart positions		
Year	Album details	US	US Heat.	US Ind.
2005	Egypt Central: Released: January 15, 2008; Label: Fat Lady Music/ILG; Format: CD	—	8	37
2011	White Rabbit: Released: May 31, 2011; Label: Fat Lady Music/ILG; Format: CD	78	—	12
"—" denotes a release that did not chart.

=== Extended plays ===
Year	Album details
2014	Murder in the French Quarter: Rare & Unreleased: Released: August 19, 2014; Label: Independent; Format: Digital CD
2021	Burn With You: Released: July 9, 2021; Label: A Window In; Format: Digital CD

=== Singles ===
Year	Song	Peak chart positions		Album
Year	Song	US Main.	US Rock	Album
2007	"You Make Me Sick"	21	—	Egypt Central
2008	"Taking You Down"	37	—	Egypt Central
2011	"White Rabbit"	17	41	White Rabbit
2011	"Kick Ass"	23	—	White Rabbit
2012	"Enemy Inside"	—	—	White Rabbit
2019	"Raise the Gates"	—	—	Burn With You
2019	"Dead Machine"	—	—	Burn With You
2020	"Over Soon"	—	—	Burn With You
2020	"Hunted"	—	—	Burn With You
2021	"Let Me Out"	—	—	Burn With You
2021	"Burn With You"	—	—	Burn With You
2022	"Beautiful Misery"	—	—	
2022	"No Place Like Home"	—	—	
2024	“Nobody Owns Me”	-	-	

=== Music videos ===
Year	Song	Ref.
2008	"You Make Me Sick"	
2011	"White Rabbit"	
2011	"Kick Ass" (Live)	

== See also ==
- Devour the Day
