= 18 Days =

Single by Saving Abel

from the album Saving Abel
- Released: September 16, 2008 (rock radio); January 27, 2009 (mainstream radio)
- Recorded: 2007
- Genre: Hard rock
- Length: 3:52
- Label: Virgin
- Songwriters: Jason Null; Jared Weeks

Saving Abel singles chronology
"Addicted" (2008)	"18 Days" (2008)	"Drowning (Face Down)" (2009)

Music video
- "18 Days" on YouTube

"18 Days" is the second single by the American rock band Saving Abel from their self-titled debut album. It was released after the band's hit single "Addicted". "18 Days" reached number 10 on the Billboard Hot Modern Rock Tracks chart and number six on the Hot Mainstream Rock Tracks chart. The song is also featured in Tapulous' hit iPhone OS games Tap Tap Revenge and Tap Tap Revenge 2.

== Track listings ==
Digital single

1. "18 Days" (rock mix) — 3:50

Digital EP (18 Days Tour EP)

1. "18 Days" (acoustic version) — 3:48
2. "Goodbye" — 4:03
3. "Trying to Clear My Head" — 2:44

== Charts ==
=== Weekly charts ===
Chart (2008–2009)	Peak position
Canada Rock (Billboard)	11
US Adult Pop Airplay (Billboard)	32
US Alternative Airplay (Billboard)	10
US Bubbling Under Hot 100 (Billboard)	4
US Mainstream Rock (Billboard)	6
US Pop Airplay (Billboard)	32

=== Year-end charts ===
Chart (2009)	Position
US Mainstream Rock (Billboard)	29

== Release history ==
Region	Date	Format(s)	Label	Ref.
United States	September 2, 2008	Digital download (rock mix)	Virgin	
United States	September 15, 2008	Alternative radio	Virgin	
United States	January 27, 2009	Contemporary hit radio	Virgin	
United States	April 7, 2009	Digital download (tour EP)	Virgin	

== Certifications ==
Region	Certification	Certified units/sales
United States (RIAA)	Gold	500,000^{‡}
^{‡} Sales+streaming figures based on certification alone.
