= Bringing Down the Giant (song) =

Single by Saving Abel

from the album Bringing Down the Giant
- Released: May 14, 2012
- Recorded: 2012
- Genre: Hard rock; post-grunge
- Length: 3:53 (album version); 3:17 (single version)
- Label: eOne
- Songwriters: Blair Daly; Skidd Mills; Jason Null; Jared Weeks
- Producer: Skidd Mills

Saving Abel singles chronology
"Miss America" (2011)	"Bringing Down the Giant" (2012)	"Mystify" (2013)

Music video
- "Bringing Down the Giant" on YouTube

"Bringing Down the Giant" is a song by the American rock band Saving Abel, released as the lead single from their third album Bringing Down the Giant.

== Track listing ==
Digital single

1. "Bringing Down the Giant" — 3:17

== Charts ==
Chart (2012)	Peak position
US Hot Rock & Alternative Songs (Billboard)	37
US Mainstream Rock (Billboard)	13

== Release history ==
Region	Date	Format(s)	Label	Ref.
United States	May 14, 2012	Digital download	eOne	
