= Egypt Central (album) =

Studio album by Egypt Central
- Released: April 26, 2005 (Self-released); January 15, 2008 (Re-issue)
- Recorded: 2004–2005
- Genres: Alternative metal, nu metal, post-grunge
- Length: 38:22 (Re-release); 38:01 (Self-released)
- Label: Fat Lady Music/ILG
- Producer: Josh Abraham

Egypt Central chronology
Egypt Central (2005)	White Rabbit (2011)

2008 re-issue cover

Egypt Central is the debut album by the rock music group Egypt Central. The album was recorded while the band was signed to Lava Records, only to get dropped before the album was released. Due to the overwhelming number of people wanting the album, the band self-released it on April 26, 2005. The album was made available online through CD Baby and briefly through Amazon.com, as well as music stores throughout the Memphis area. The band signed a record deal in April, 2006 with Bieler Bros. Records, with the intention of releasing the same album. However, the band parted ways with the label in late July. The album was set for release on August 22.

On October 5, 2007, the band officially signed a record deal with Fat Lady Music/ILG distributed by ADA. The original CD has been remixed and remastered with new artwork and was released to retailers nationwide on January 15, 2008 featuring their new single "You Make Me Sick". The entire recording is now available on iTunes. Both "You Make Me Sick" and "Taking You Down" were featured on the video game WWE SmackDown vs. Raw 2009. "Taking You Down" was featured on the soundtrack to The Cave, but not in the movie itself, and "Over and Under" was featured in the movie The Condemned.

== Track listing ==
No.	Title	Length
1.	"Different"	3:07
2.	"You Make Me Sick"	3:58
3.	"Over and Under"	2:55
4.	"Taking You Down"	2:58
5.	"Leap of Faith"	3:38
6.	"The Way"	3:25
7.	"Push Away"	3:20
8.	"Walls of Innocence"	3:52
9.	"Locked and Caged"	3:06
10.	"Just Another Lie"	3:36
11.	"Home"	4:12

Bonus online pre-order track

No.	Title	Length
12.	"Awesome (Instrumental)"	3:46

== Personnel ==
Band members

- Blake "Black" Allison – drums, vocals
- Joey Chicago – bass guitar, vocals
- John Falls – lead vocals
- Heath Hindman – guitar (2008 re-release)
- Stephen Williams – guitar, vocals (2005 release)

Production

- Paul David Hager – mixing
- Josh Abraham – producer, mixing, audio production
- Louis Levin – executive producer
- George Marino – mastering
- Pete Matthews – mixing
- Ryan Williams – engineer, audio engineer
