= Fall Into Me (album) =

Studio album by Katie Armiger
- Released: January 15, 2013
- Genre: Country
- Length: 48:58
- Label: Cold River
- Producer: Chad Carlson

Katie Armiger chronology
Confessions of a Nice Girl (2010)	Fall Into Me (2013)

Singles from Fall Into Me
- 1. "Better in a Black Dress" Released: June 4, 2012; 2. "Playin' with Fire" Released: February 11, 2013; 3. "Safe" Released: January 20, 2014

Fall Into Me is the fourth studio album of country music artist Katie Armiger. It was released January 15, 2013, via Cold River Records. The album's track listing was released December 10, 2012; Armiger had her hand in writing all of the album's 14 songs.

== Critical reception ==
The album garnered mainly positive reviews. Most praised her transition to a more risky sound. Taste of Country's Billy Dukes described the album as "a rollercoaster ride that at times feels like that line from Taylor Swift‘s "We Are Never Ever Getting Back Together". Roughstock's Matt Bjorke described the album as "record of growth and change and about a woman asserting herself more than ever. The evolution of Katie Armiger is complete". GAC's Daryl Addison said "it’s clear that Katie’s delivery is only getting better".

== Singles ==
The album's lead single, "Better in a Black Dress", was released on or about June 4, 2012. It peaked on Billboard's Hot Country Songs chart before the new chart methodology was enforced at number 45 in September. It peaked on the new Country Airplay chart at number 42 in November.

The album's second single, "Playin' with Fire", was released on February 11, 2013. The song peaked at number 50 on the Country Airplay chart in June 2013.

The album's third single, "Safe", was released January 20, 2014, in dedication to our nation's first responders. As part of her "Project Feel Safe" campaign, Katie Armiger intended the audience to use the hashtag #projectfeelsafe to give thanks by sharing messages of support, personal stories and photos on Facebook, Twitter and Instagram.

== Track listing ==
No.	Title	Writer(s)	Length
1.	"He's Gonna Change"	Katie Armiger, Blair Daly	3:20
2.	"Man I Thought You Were"	Armiger, Ashlee Hewitt	3:41
3.	"Playin' with Fire"	Armiger, Ricky Davis, Micol Davis	3:20
4.	"Better in a Black Dress"	Armiger, Daly	3:38
5.	"Okay Alone"	Armiger, Melissa Fuller, Dee Briggs	3:45
6.	"Black and White"	Armiger, Chad Carlson	3:26
7.	"I'm Free"	Armiger, Carlson, Joe West	3:08
8.	"Merry Go Round"	Armiger, Daly, Skidd Mills	3:27
9.	"Baby You're Everything"	Armiger, Carlson, West	3:43
10.	"Cardboard Boxes"	Armiger, Jesse Tucker, Megan Nicole	3:32
11.	"Stealing Hearts"	Armiger, Katie Kessler	3:38
12.	"Not Too Late"	Armiger, Tucker, Tyler Ward	3:17
13.	"So Long"	Armiger, Bruce Wallace, Amanda Flynn	3:07
14.	"Safe"	Armiger, Mallary Hope	3:56

== Personnel ==
- Katie Armiger – handclapping, lead vocals, background vocals
- Robert Bailey – background vocals
- Nick Buda – drums
- Tom Bukovac – 12-string acoustic guitar, acoustic guitar, electric guitar
- Chad Carlson – bass guitar, dobro, acoustic guitar, electric guitar, keyboards, programming, background vocals
- Chad Cromwell – drums
- Eric Darken – cowbell, percussion, shaker, vibraphone
- Dan Dugmore – steel guitar, lap steel guitar
- Melissa Fuller – background vocals
- Kenny Greenberg – electric guitar, steel guitar
- Vicki Hampton – background vocals
- Matt Heasley – bandleader
- Wes Hightower – background vocals
- Mallary Hope – background vocals
- Tim Lauer – accordion, clavinet, Fender Rhodes, harmonica, harmonium, mellotron, organ, piano, synthesizer
- Rachel Loy – bass guitar
- Mac McAnally – acoustic guitar
- Rob McNelley – electric guitar
- Megan Nicole – background vocals
- Jimmie Lee Sloas – bass guitar
- Ilya Toshinsky – banjo, bouzouki, dobro, 12-string guitar, acoustic guitar, resonator guitar, mandolin
- Jesse Tucker – acoustic guitar
- Bruce Wallace – background vocals
- Alex Wolaver – viola
- Annie Wolaver – violin
- Benjamin Wolaver – cello
- Bill Wolaver – string arrangements
- Nir Z – drums, handclapping

== Chart performance ==
=== Weekly charts ===
Chart (2013)	Peak position
US Billboard 200	32
US Top Country Albums (Billboard)	7
US Independent Albums (Billboard)	6

=== Year-end charts ===
Chart (2013)	Position
US Top Country Albums (Billboard)	64

=== Singles ===
Year	Single	Peak chart positions	
Year	Single	US Country	US Country Airplay
2012	"Better in a Black Dress"	45	42
2013	"Playin' with Fire"	—	50
2014	"Safe"	—	57
"—" denotes releases that did not chart
