= White Rabbit (Egypt Central album) =

Studio album by Egypt Central

Studio album by Egypt Central
- Released: May 31, 2011
- Genre: Post-grunge, alternative metal, hard rock, nu metal
- Length: 43:13
- Label: Fat Lady Music/ILG
- Producer: Skidd Mills

Egypt Central chronology
Egypt Central (2008)	White Rabbit (2011)

Singles from White Rabbit
- 1. "White Rabbit" Released: February 15, 2011; 2. "Kick Ass" Released: September 13, 2011; 3. "Enemy Inside" Released: February 28, 2012

Professional ratings
Review scores
Source	Rating
AllMusic	3.5/5 stars
Metalholic	(9.2/10)

White Rabbit is the second studio album by the rock music group Egypt Central, released on May 31, 2011. The first single, "White Rabbit", was released to radio stations on February 15, 2011 and made available on digital platforms on March 1, 2011. A 30-second preview of the album was posted on the official Egypt Central YouTube channel.

== Track listing ==
No.	Title	Length
1.	"Ghost Town"	3:44
2.	"White Rabbit"	3:37
3.	"Goodnight"	3:44
4.	"Kick Ass"	3:18
5.	"Change"	3:38
6.	"The Drug (Part 1)"	3:12
7.	"Down in Flames"	3:53
8.	"Enemy Inside (Part 2)"	4:12
9.	"Blame"	3:19
10.	"Dying to Leave"	3:26
11.	"Surrender"	2:59
12.	"Backfire"	4:05

=== Deluxe edition bonus tracks ===
No.	Title	Length
13.	"Liar"	3:30
14.	"15 Minutes"	3:16

=== Bonus online pre-order track ===
No.	Title	Length
15.	"White Rabbit (acoustic)"	4:05

== Singles ==
"White Rabbit" was released as the first single from the album. The song peaked at number 17 on the U.S. Mainstream Rock chart.

"Kick Ass" was the second single from the album and peaked at number 21 on the Mainstream Rock chart. The single also contains a separate track called "Kick Off," which is a censored version of "Kick Ass" replacing the words "Kick Ass" with "Kick Off" instead. The track was also featured in the 2012 film American Reunion.

"Enemy Inside" was the third and final single released from the album. An acoustic version of the song was recorded along with the single.

== Charts ==
Chart	Peak position
U.S. Billboard 200	78
U.S. Billboard Rock Albums	22
U.S. Billboard Independent Albums	12
U.S. Billboard Hard Rock Albums	5

== Personnel ==
- Skidd Mills – producer
- Blake "Black" Allison – drums, vocals
- Joey Chicago – bass guitar, vocals
- John Falls – lead vocals
- Jeff James – guitar, vocals
