= This Is My Heart =

Studio album by Since October
- Released: May 27, 2008
- Genre: Alternative metal; nu metal
- Length: 38:22
- Label: Tooth & Nail
- Producer: Travis Wyrick, Marcos Curiel

Since October chronology
| Gasping for Hope (2006) | This Is My Heart (2008) | Life, Scars, Apologies (2010) |

Singles from This Is My Heart
- 1. "Disaster" Released: March 10, 2009; 2. "Guilty" Released: July 9, 2009

Professional ratings
Review scores
| Source | Rating |
|---|---|
| Indie Vision Music | 6.5/10 |
| Jesus Freak Hideout | 2/5 stars |

This Is My Heart is the first full-length studio album released in 2008 by alternative metal band Since October. It is the first full-length to be released on Tooth & Nail Records. They have released a music video for their songs: "Disaster" and "Guilty." Guilty reached number 21 on the U.S. Mainstream Rock chart. "Disaster" placed on the X 2009 Christian Rock Hits compilation as a bonus track.

== Track listing ==
| No. | Title | Length |
|---|---|---|
| 1. | "Emily" | 0:59 |
| 2. | "My Heart" | 3:14 |
| 3. | "Beautiful" | 3:32 |
| 4. | "Disaster" | 3:23 |
| 5. | "In This Moment" | 3:27 |
| 6. | "Guilty" | 2:58 |
| 7. | "World to Me" | 3:37 |
| 8. | "Live to Die" | 3:29 |
| 9. | "Follow Me Down" | 3:47 |
| 10. | "Waiting" | 3:47 |
| 11. | "Everything" | 3:00 |
| 12. | "Part of Me" | 3:14 |
| Total length: | | 38:22 |

== Members ==
- Ben Graham – lead vocals
- Luke Graham – guitar, backing vocals
- Josh Johnson – bass, backing vocals
- Audie Grantham – drums, screaming vocals
