= Devour the Day =

American hard rock band

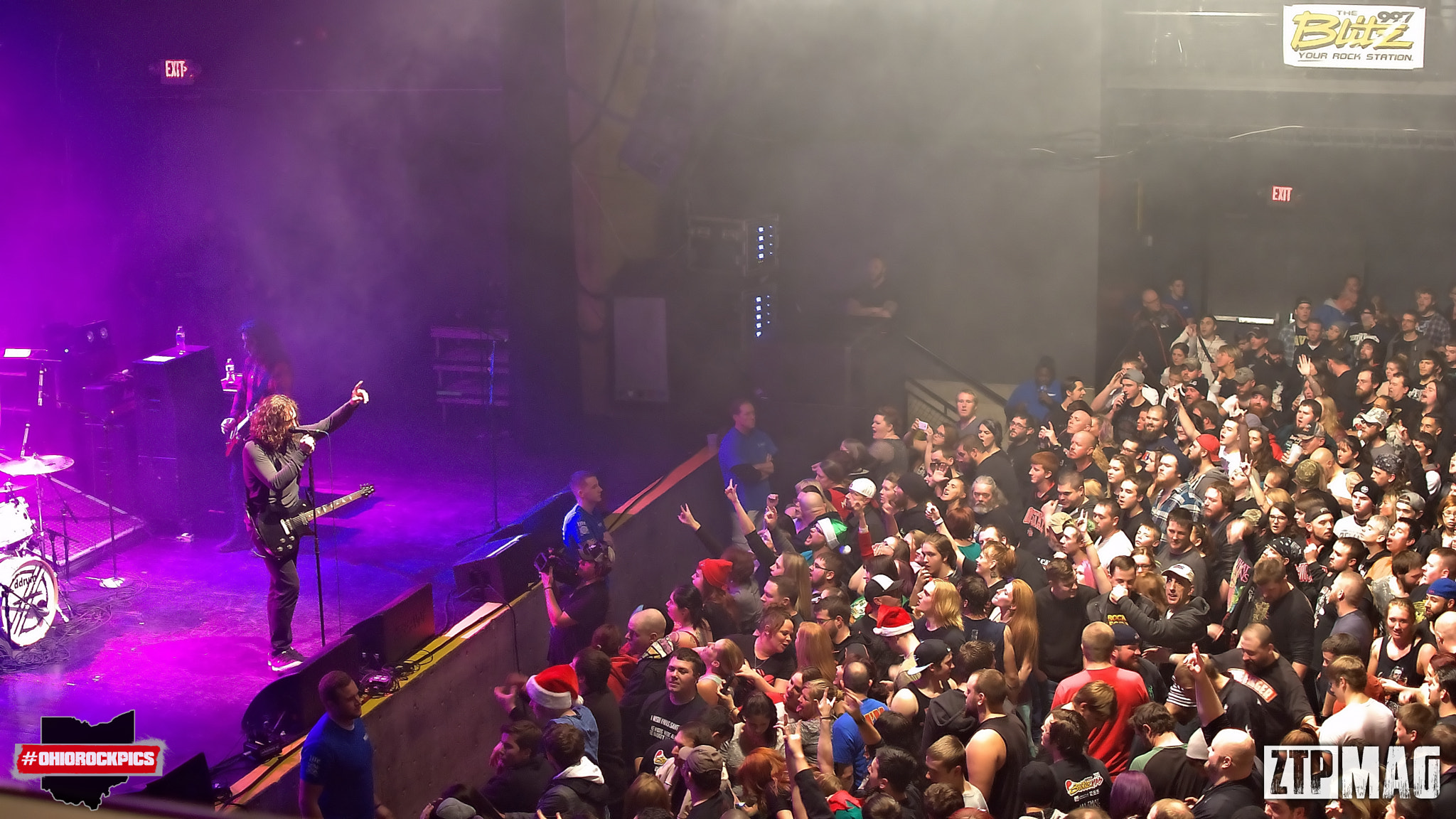
- (Left) Blake Allison (Right) Joey Walser

Background information
- Origin: Memphis, Tennessee, United States
- Genres: Hard rock, nu metal, alternative metal, post-grunge, experimental rock
- Years active: 2012–present
- Labels: Razor & Tie, Fat Lady
- Members: Joey "Chicago" Walser; Blake Allison; Ronnie Farris
- Past members: David Hoffman
- Website: www.devourtheday.com

Devour the Day is an American hard rock band founded in 2012 by singer/guitarist Blake Allison and bassist Joey "Chicago" Walser after the breakup of their previous band Egypt Central.

Hallmarks of the band's sound include "anthemic choruses, melodic riffs, and muscular focus," according to AllMusic.

== History ==
=== Formation (2012) ===
After more than a year of inactivity from Egypt Central, it was announced on December 3, 2012 that both vocalist John Falls and guitarist Jeff James would not be continuing on with the band, thus bringing an end to Egypt Central. The demise of Egypt Central and the formation of Devour the Day were announced simultaneously via a letter written by Joey Chicago and posted to Egypt Central's Facebook page.

=== Time & Pressure (2013–2015) ===
Walser and Allison began working on the band's debut album in 2012 with producer Skidd Mills for a Spring 2013 release.

Teasers of the songs "Blackout", "Respect", "Move On", and "You And Not Me" were posted on the band's YouTube page

Walser and Allison announced the band's touring line up would consist of former Egypt Central guitarist Jeff James and drummer Dustin Schoenhofer (Walls of Jericho, Bury Your Dead) .

On March 18, 2013, the band's debut album "Time & Pressure" was released on May 7, 2013. The first single "Good Man" was released to radio on March 29, 2013 and to digital retailers on April 2, 2013.

The band spent the majority of 2013 touring with such acts as Pop Evil, Hinder, Sevendust, Otherwise, Theory of a Deadman, Candlebox, Trapt, and Sick Puppies.

On January 14, 2014, the band re-released their debut album which featured remixed and remastered versions of the album tracks as well as an unreleased song titled "Check Your Head" and an acoustic version of "Good Man".

The band took part in The Hell Pop Tour II headlined by In This Moment with additional support from Butcher Babies, All Hail the Yeti and Before the Mourning. They also performed in Lazerfest in Des Moines, Iowa on March 10, 2015.

On February 10, 2015. Devour the Day released a digital single called "Faith".

=== S.O.A.R. (2016) ===
S.O.A.R. was released on April 1, 2016. The first single titled "Lightning in the Sky" was released on January 22, 2016 and the second single titled "The Bottom" was released on March 29, 2016.

=== Signals (2018) ===
On August 17, 2018, their new single, "The Censor" was released with accompanying music video. The new album, Signals, was released on October 26, 2018.

== Band members ==
=== Official members ===
- Joey "Chicago" Walser – bass, backing vocals
- Blake Allison – lead vocals, guitars
- Justin Kier – drums, percussion

• Stephen Freeman - guitars

=== Former members ===
- David Hoffman – lead guitar, backing vocals (2012-2017)

=== Former touring members ===
- Jeff James – lead guitar (2013)
- Dustin Schoenhofer – drums (2013)
- Taylor Carroll – drums (2019)

== Discography ==
=== Studio albums ===
Title	Details	Peak chart positions	
Title	Details	US Heat.	US Rock
Time & Pressure	Released: May 7, 2013, (Re-released: January 14, 2014) (US); Label: Fat Lady Music	13	21
S.O.A.R.	Released: April 1, 2016 (US); Label: Razor & Tie	9	20
Signals	Released: October 26, 2018 (US); Label: Razor & Tie	—	—

=== Extended plays ===
Title	Details
Fragments of Us	Released: July 12, 2024; Label: A Window In

=== Singles ===
Title	Year	Peak positions		Album
Title	Year	U.S. Air.	U.S. Main.	Album
"Good Man"	2013	33	9	Time & Pressure
"Move On"	2014	—	27	Time & Pressure
"Respect"	2014	—	20	Time & Pressure
"Faith"	2015	—	15	Non-album single
"Lightning in the Sky"	2016	50	18	S.O.A.R.
"The Bottom"	2016	—	19	S.O.A.R.
"The Censor"	2018	—	—	Signals
"Faithless"	2018	—	—	Signals

=== Music videos ===
Song	Year	Director
"Respect"	2014	Charles Brandon
"Faith" (Live)	2015	
"Lightning In The Sky"	2016	Max Moore
"The Bottom"	2016	Devour the Day
"The Censor"	2018	Chase Yandek
"Faithless"	2018	Chase Yandek
"Wonderful Creatures"	2019	
"Worse Than Death"	2023	Orie McGinness
"Nobody Owns Me"	2024	
"Empty"	2024	Orie McGinness
