= Confessions of a Nice Girl =

Studio album by Katie Armiger
- Released: October 5, 2010
- Genre: Country
- Label: Cold River
- Producers: Bonnie Baker; Chad Carlson; Blair Daly; New Voice Entertainment; Charlie Sexton

Katie Armiger chronology
Believe (2008)	Confessions of a Nice Girl (2010)	Fall Into Me (2013)

Singles from Confessions of a Nice Girl
- 1. "Kiss Me Now" Released: February 1, 2010; 2. "Leaving Home" Released: June 24, 2010; 3. "Best Song Ever" Released: October 4, 2010; 4. "I Do But Do I" Released: July 11, 2011; 5. "Scream" Released: October 31, 2011

Confessions of a Nice Girl is the third studio album by American country music artist Katie Armiger. It was released by Cold River Records in 2010. Three singles were released from this album in 2010: "Kiss Me Now", "Leaving Home" and "Best Song Ever", the latter of which is her best charted single to date. It peaked at number 42 on the Billboard Hot Country Songs chart in 2011. The album was re-released in late 2011 with new bonus tracks, including "I Do But Do I," which served as the album's fourth single. "Scream" was released in October 2011 as the fifth single.

== Track listing ==
1. "Best Song Ever" (Katie Armiger, Amanda Flynn, Bruce Wallace) – 2:33
2. "Kiss Me Now" (Armiger, Sarah Buxton, Blair Daly) – 3:09
3. "That's Why" (Armiger, Rebecca Lynn Howard) – 4:01
4. "Nice Girl" (Buxton, Jeremy Stover, Brian Maher) – 2:50
5. "Cry, Cry, Cry" (Armiger) – 4:18
6. "Ain't Gonna Happen" (Rachel Proctor, Wallace) – 3:40
7. "I Will Be" (Armiger, Lisa McCallum) – 3:33
8. "Scream" (Armiger, Daly, Buxton) – 3:43
9. "Ain't So Sweet" (Armiger, Daly) – 3:24
10. "Can You Handle It" (Katrina Elam, Bonnie Baker, Jessie James) – 3:36
11. "Leaving Home" (Armiger, Buxton, Daly) – 3:31
12. "Can't Keep Myself From Loving You" (Armiger, Joe West) - 3:31
13. "Strong Enough" (Proctor, Wallace) - 3:43

== Personnel ==
Credits adapted from AllMusic.

- Kurt Allison – electric guitar
- Kelly Archer – background vocals
- Katie Armiger – lead vocals, background vocals
- Mike Brignardello – bass guitar
- Nick Buda – drums
- Chad Carlson – bass guitar, acoustic guitar, electric guitar, keyboards, organ, piano, background vocals
- Eric Darken – percussion
- Howard Duck – Hammond B-3 organ, piano, strings, synthesizer
- Dan Dugmore – electric guitar, steel guitar, lap steel guitar
- Stuart Duncan – banjo, fiddle, mandolin
- Mike Durham – electric guitar
- Katrina Elam – background vocals

- Paul Franklin – steel guitar
- Kenny Greenberg – electric guitar
- Misi Hale – background vocals
- Tania Hancheroff – background vocals
- Tommy Harden – drums, percussion
- Tony Harrell – keyboards, organ, piano
- Tully Kennedy – bass guitar
- Steve King – organ
- Paul Leim – drums
- Rob McNelley – electric guitar
- Tim Marks – bass guitar
- David Monsy – bass guitar

- Gary Morse – steel guitar, lap steel guitar
- Rich Redmond – drums, percussion
- Jeff Roach – keyboards, organ, piano
- Mike Rojas – piano
- Charlie Sexton – acoustic guitar, electric guitar
- Jimmie Lee Sloas – bass guitar
- Shanna Stressberg – background vocals
- Brannen Temple – drums
- Ilya Toshinsky – banjo, acoustic guitar, mandolin
- Wanda Vick – fiddle, acoustic guitar
- Bruce Wallace – background vocals
- John Willis – acoustic guitar
- Jonathan Yudkin – string arrangements, strings

== Chart performance ==
Chart (2010)	Peak position
U.S. Billboard Top Country Albums	58
U.S. Billboard Top Heatseekers	36
