= Stupid Girl (Only in Hollywood) =

Single by Saving Abel

from the album Miss America
- Released: April 8, 2010 (digital release); April 26, 2010 (rock radio)
- Recorded: 2009–2010
- Genre: Hard rock; post-grunge
- Length: 4:19 (album version); 4:01 (radio edit)
- Label: Virgin
- Songwriters: Skidd Mills; Jason Null; Jared Weeks

Saving Abel singles chronology
"Drowning (Face Down)" (2009)	"Stupid Girl (Only in Hollywood)" (2010)	"The Sex Is Good" (2010)

Music video
- "Stupid Girl (Only in Hollywood)" on YouTube

"Stupid Girl (Only in Hollywood)" is a single by Saving Abel from their second album Miss America. The song was inspired by Keith Urban's song "Stupid Boy", which Null heard while traveling to Nashville to record, and thought "Stupid Girl" would be a great song title.

== Track listings ==
Digital single

1. "Stupid Girl (Only in Hollywood)" — 4:19

Digital single (radio edit)

1. "Stupid Girl (Only in Hollywood)" (radio edit) — 3:59

Digital EP

1. "Stupid Girl (Only in Hollywood)" (radio edit) — 4:00
2. "The Sex Is Good" (acoustic version) — 3:33
3. "Tooth and Nail" — 3:30

== Charts ==
=== Weekly charts ===
Chart (2010)	Peak position
Canada Rock (Billboard)	20
US Alternative Airplay (Billboard)	31
US Hot Rock & Alternative Songs (Billboard)	22
US Mainstream Rock (Billboard)	7

=== Year-end charts ===
Chart (2010)	Position
US Mainstream Rock (Billboard)	39

== Release history ==
Region	Date	Format(s)	Label	Ref.
United States	April 8, 2010	Digital download	Virgin	
United States	April 8, 2010	Digital download (radio edit)	Virgin	
United States	April 26, 2010	Alternative radio; active rock radio	Virgin	
Australia	2010	Digital download (EP)	Virgin	
