= Katie Armiger =

Country music singer

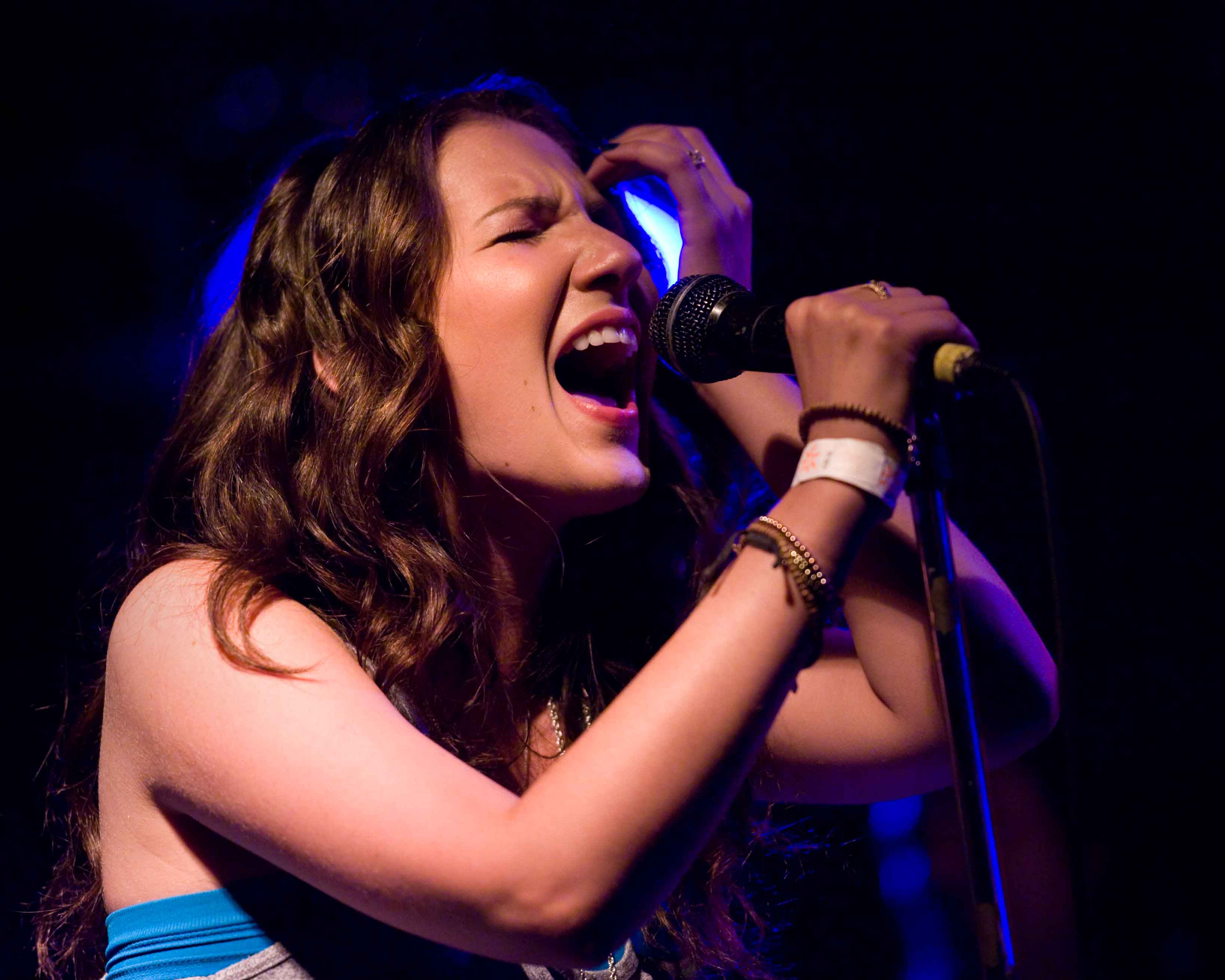
- Katie Armiger performs on July 28, 2011, in Everett, Washington

Background information
- Birth name: Kaitlyn Michelle Armiger
- Born: June 23, 1991 (age 34)
- Origin: Sugar Land, Texas, U.S.
- Genres: Country
- Occupation: Singer
- Instrument(s): Guitar, vocals
- Years active: 2007–2015
- Labels: Cold River
- Website: www.katiearmiger.com

Kaitlyn Michelle Armiger (born June 23, 1991) is a country artist from Sugar Land, Texas, U.S. She was first inspired to pursue country music after winning a Houston, Texas, citywide competition for young country singers. As of 2014, Armiger has released four albums for Cold River Records and has charted seven singles on the Billboard Hot Country Songs and Country Airplay charts.

== Career ==
Katie Armiger's self-titled debut album was released on Cold River Records in the U.S. on August 21, 2007. It was produced by Mark Oliverius, the producer for other country acts such as Lorrie Morgan and Trick Pony. The first seven tracks of her album were co-written by Armiger with Oliverius and Ashlee Hewitt.

Armiger entered the Billboard Hot Country Songs chart for the first time in 2010 with "Kiss Me Now," which reached a peak of number 55. It served as the lead-off to her third album, Confessions of a Nice Girl, which was released in October 2010, and became her first album to chart. It charted on both Billboard Top Country Albums and Billboard Heatseekers. This album was Armiger's first self-titled album and featured nine tracks that Armiger co-wrote with Nashville songwriters. "Leaving Home" and "Best Song Ever" followed as the album's second and third singles, the former failed to chart, while the latter peaked at number 42. Her third album was re-released on September 20, 2011 to include her fourth single, "I Do But Do I", which was released to radio on July 11, 2011. The re-release also included three more new songs, a dance mix of "Best Song Ever", and the music videos for "I Do But Do I" and "Best Song Ever." "Scream," which was released as the fifth and final single from the album in October 2011, peaked at number 47 on the Hot Country Songs chart.

"Better in a Black Dress" was released in mid-June 2012, debuting at number 54 on Billboard's Hot Country Songs chart for the week of June 23, 2012. Since then, the song has become her highest charting single. The album that followed on January 22, 2013, Fall Into Me, became her highest charting album to date. It marked Armiger's first entry on the Independent Albums chart (No. 6) and the all-genre Billboard 200 (No. 32). It also became her first top 10 country album, debuting at number 7. The album's second single, "Playin' with Fire", was released February 11, 2013.

Katie Armiger left the music business in 2015. She later said she had been blacklisted after complaining about sexual harassment by radio programmers. Lawsuits between Armiger and Cold River Records and its founder Peter Timothy O'Heeron were settled in 2019. Terms of the settlement are confidential.

== Discography ==
=== Studio albums ===
Title	Album details	Peak chart positions			
Title	Album details	US Country	US	US Indie	US Heat
Katie Armiger	Release date: August 14, 2007; Label: Cold River Records; Format: CD, music download	—	—	—	—
Believe	Release date: July 1, 2008; Label: Cold River Records; Format: CD, Music Download	—	—	—	—
Confessions of a Nice Girl	Release date: October 5, 2010; Label: Cold River Records; Format: CD, Music Download	58	—	—	36
Fall Into Me	Release date: January 15, 2013; Label: Cold River Records; Format: CD, Music Download	7	32	6	—
"—" denotes releases that did not chart

=== Singles ===
Year	Single	Peak chart positions		Album
Year	Single	US Country	US Country Airplay	Album
2007	"17 in Abilene"	—	—	Katie Armiger
2008	"Make Me Believe"	—	—	Katie Armiger
2008	"Unseen"	—	—	Believe
2009	"Trail of Lies"	—	—	Believe
2009	"Gone"	—	—	Believe
2010	"Kiss Me Now"	55	—	Confessions of a Nice Girl
2010	"Leaving Home"	—	—	Confessions of a Nice Girl
2010	"Best Song Ever"	42	—	Confessions of a Nice Girl
2011	"I Do But Do I"	—	—	Confessions of a Nice Girl
2011	"Scream"	47	—	Confessions of a Nice Girl
2012	"Better in a Black Dress"	45	42	Fall Into Me
2013	"Playin' with Fire"	—	50	Fall Into Me
2014	"Safe"	—	57	Fall Into Me
2014	"One Night Between Friends"	—	60	—
"—" denotes releases that did not chart

=== Featured singles ===
Year	Title	Artist	Album
2014	"Glitter"	Coco Jones	—

=== Music videos ===
Year	Title	Director
2007	"17 in Abilene"	Kristin Barlowe
2008	"Make Me Believe"	Kristin Barlowe
2008	"Unseen"	Stephen Shepherd
2008	"All I Want for Christmas Is You"	Glenn Switzer
2008	"I Just Want to Be with You This Christmas"	Glenn Switzer
2009	"Trail of Lies"	Stephen Shepherd
2009	"Gone"	Traci Goudie
2010	"Kiss Me Now"	Evan Kaufmann
2010	"Leaving Home"	Stephen Shepherd
2010	"Best Song Ever"	Stephen Shepherd
2011	"I Do but Do I"	Stephen Shepherd
2011	"Scream"	Ryan Hamblin
2012	"Better in a Black Dress"	Stephen Shepherd
2013	"Playin' with Fire"	Stephen Shepherd
2014	"Safe"	Justin Baldoni
2014	"One Night Between Friends"	Justin Baldoni
