= Miss America (Saving Abel album) =

Studio album by Saving Abel
- Released: June 8, 2010
- Recorded: 2009
- Genre: Hard rock; post-grunge; Southern rock
- Length: 41:57
- Label: Virgin
- Producer: Skidd Mills; Marti Frederiksen

Saving Abel chronology
18 Days Tour EP (2009)	Miss America (2010)	Bringing Down the Giant (2012)

Singles from Miss America
- 1. "Stupid Girl (Only in Hollywood)" Released: April 8, 2010; 2. "The Sex Is Good" Released: August 31, 2010; 3. "Miss America" Released: March 7, 2011

Professional ratings
Review scores
Source	Rating
AllMusic	2/5 stars
Sputnikmusic	2/5 stars

Miss America is the second studio album by the American rock band Saving Abel, released on June 8, 2010. The album title comes from the song of the same name, with former lead singer Jared Weeks explaining the choice as the band wanting "to give something back" to the American soldiers who serve overseas. The first single from the album, "Stupid Girl (Only in Hollywood)" was released as a digital single on April 8, 2010, and released to radio on April 26, 2010.

The album debuted at No. 24 on the Billboard 200, making it their best-charting album to date.

This was their final release on Virgin Records before moving to eOne Music.

== Background ==
Saving Abel frontman Jared Weeks said fans will hear "a much more mature band" with the release of Miss America. "We've been out on the road for three years", Weeks told Billboard.com, "but what we did was any time we had a day off somewhere, we'd fly down to Nashville and write a song or two, then fly right out and do a show. So we're out on the road and experiencing things, so it was easy to have stuff to write about. I'm super-confident this album is gonna back up our first album", 2008's gold-certified Saving Abel.

The singer described the 11-track album, produced again by Skidd Mills, as "versatile" but true to the character of its predecessor. "One of the strongest things that we're proud of here is our Southern heritage, man, and you can tell that in this album", Weeks said. "We do throw a little bit more rock 'n' roll in there, but we've got a little more in-depth than the Southern twang that made Saving Abel who it was when "Addicted" (the ubiquitous radio hit from Saving Abel) came out".

Weeks said that several of the new album's songs—including "Bloody Sunday", "Hell of a Ride" and the ballad "Angel Without Wings" – have been around for the better part of a year and even road-tested. But like "Addicted", Miss America's first single, "Stupid Girl (Only in Hollywood)", was one of the last songs written for the album, shortly after the group's trip to this year's Grammy Awards ceremony in Los Angeles.

"There was a little bit of pressure", he recalls, "'cause we thought we were done and (the label) wanted another single, so we had to go back and write. I had just gotten back from the Grammys, and I read a quote from Marilyn Monroe where she said that a wise girl always kisses before she's kissed...So that's basically how the chorus of the song goes, 'You always kiss before you're kissed/You're not a stupid girl'. It's not really calling a girl stupid'".

Saving Abel shot a video for "Stupid Girl (Only in Hollywood)" during the month of April in Los Angeles and have already determined that another one of the album's rockers, "The Sex is Good", will be Miss America's second single. The title track, meanwhile, was inspired by the group's performances for U.S. troops both here and overseas, while "Mississippi Moonshine" shows off the twangier side of Saving Abel's roots. "The Sex Is Good" became Saving Abel's first No. 1 single on the Hot Mainstream Rock Tracks in January 2011.

The group toured in support of Miss America, and performed at the Rocklahoma Festival on May 28. Weeks said Saving Abel has "put in our bids for a few of the big tours that are going out this summer" but adds that "if the single does what it's supposed to, we may just go out by ourselves. It all depends on the people who are listening to us".

== Critical reception ==
The reviews for Miss America have been generally mixed to negative, sustaining two 2 star reviews from both AllMusic and Sputnikmusic.

== Track listing ==
Miss America
No.	Title	Writer(s)	Length
1.	"Tap Out"	Jared Weeks; Jason Null; Skidd Mills	4:07
2.	"Stupid Girl (Only in Hollywood)"	Weeks; Null; Mills	4:19
3.	"Contagious"	Weeks; Null; Mills; Scott Bartlett	3:37
4.	"The Sex Is Good"	Weeks; Null; Mills	3:31
5.	"Bloody Sunday"	Weeks; Null; Mills	3:47
6.	"I'm Still Alive"	Weeks; Mills	3:48
7.	"Mississippi Moonshine"	Weeks; Null; Mills	3:13
8.	"Angel Without Wings"	Weeks; Null; Mills	4:16
9.	"Miss America"	Weeks; Null; Mills; Martin Frederiksen	3:40
10.	"I Need You"	Null	3:47
11.	"Hell of a Ride"	Weeks; Null; Mills; Bartlett; Blake Dixon; Eric Taylor	3:44
Total length:			41:57

== Personnel ==
- Jared Weeks – lead vocals
- Jason Null – lead guitar
- Scott Bartlett – rhythm guitar, backing vocals
- Eric Taylor – bass
- Blake Dixon – drums

== Charts ==
Chart performance for Miss America
Chart (2010)	Peak position
Canadian Albums (Nielsen SoundScan)	99
US Billboard 200	24
US Top Alternative Albums (Billboard)	3
US Top Hard Rock Albums (Billboard)	1
US Top Rock Albums (Billboard)	4
