= Guilty (Since October song) =

Single by Since October

from the album This Is My Heart
- Released: July 9, 2009
- Recorded: 2008
- Genre: Alternative metal, nu metal
- Length: 2:58
- Label: Tooth & Nail
- Songwriter(s): Since October
- Producer(s): Travis Wyrick, Marcos Curiel

Since October singles chronology
| "Disaster" (2009) | "Guilty" (2009) | "The Show" (2010) |

"Guilty" is a song by American alternative metal band Since October. The song was released as the second single from the band's debut studio album, This Is My Heart. The song was a moderate success, peaking at No. 21 on the Billboard Mainstream Rock chart, staying on the chart for 20 weeks.

A demo version of "Guilty" originally appeared on the album Gasping for Hope.

== Track listing ==
| No. | Title | Length |
|---|---|---|
| 1. | "Guilty" | 2:58 |
| 2. | "Guilty" (acoustic) | 4:06 |

== Charts ==
| Chart (2009) | Position |
|---|---|
| US Main | 21 |

== Personnel ==
- Ben Graham – lead vocals
- Luke Graham – guitar
- Josh Johnson – bass
- Audie Grantham – drums, screamed vocals
