= Saving Abel (album) =

Studio album by Saving Abel
- Released: March 11, 2008
- Recorded: 2007
- Studios: 747 Studios (Memphis, Tennessee); Skiddco Music (Franklin, Tennessee)
- Genres: Hard rock; post-grunge; Southern rock
- Length: 42:35
- Label: Virgin
- Producer: Skidd Mills

Saving Abel chronology
Saving Abel (2008)	18 Days Tour EP (2009)

Singles from Saving Abel
- 1. "Addicted" Released: March 2008; 2. "18 Days" Released: September 16, 2008; 3. "Drowning (Face Down)" Released: March 24, 2009; 4. "New Tattoo" Released: September 2009

Professional ratings
Review scores
Source	Rating
AbsolutePunk	90%
AllMusic	2.5/5 stars
Tunelab Music	9/10 stars

Saving Abel is the debut studio album by the American rock band Saving Abel. It was released on March 11, 2008 and produced by Skidd Mills, producer of their independently released album of the same name.

The album peaked at number 49 on the Billboard 200, and was certified Gold by the RIAA on March 6, 2009.

== Singles ==
The first single off the album is "Addicted" which has received airplay across the country. It has reached number 20 on the Billboard Hot 100. It sold over 800,000 copies in the US alone.

The second single, "18 Days", reached number 6 on the Hot Mainstream Rock Tracks chart.

"Drowning (Face Down)" became their third single and received airplay across the country.

== Critical reception ==
The reviews that Saving Abel received have been generally positive. Only Rock had given the album 3 and 1/2 stars, while AllMusic gave the album 2 and 1/2 stars. AbsolutePunk gave the album a rating of 90% rating, and in another very positive review, Tunelab Music gave the album a rating of 9 out of 10 stars.

== Track listing ==
Saving Abel track listing
No.	Title	Writer(s)	Length
1.	"New Tattoo"	Null	4:23
2.	"Addicted"	Mills; Null; Weeks	3:43
3.	"She Got Over Me"	Mills; Null; Wallen; Weeks	4:03
4.	"18 Days"	Null; Weeks	3:52
5.	"Drowning (Face Down)"	Mills; Null; Weeks	3:56
6.	"In God's Eyes"	Bartlett; Dixon; Null; Taylor; Weeks	3:56
7.	"Sailed Away"	Mills; Rimer; Weeks	4:19
8.	"Beautiful Day"	Mills; Null; Weeks	4:15
9.	"Out of My Face"	Bartlett; Null	3:41
10.	"Running from You"	Harris; Mills; Null; Weeks	3:29
11.	"Beautiful You"	Mills; Null; Weeks	2:52
Total length:			42:35

=== B-sides ===
- "Goodbye" – 4:07 ("Goodbye" is also on the 18 Days Tour EP)
- "After All" – 3:16 ("After All" is also on NCIS soundtrack)

== Personnel ==
Saving Abel

- Jared Weeks – lead vocals
- Jason Null – lead guitar
- Scott Bartlett – rhythm guitar, backing vocals
- Eric Taylor – bass
- Blake Dixon – drums

Production

- Skidd Mills – producer, mixing, audio engineer
- Brad Blackwood – mastering at Euphoria Masters
- Scott Hardin – assistant engineer

Additional personnel

- Skidd Mills – guitar, bass, hammond B3 organ, strings arranger, programming
- Scott Hardin – piano
- Anna Acosta – violin
- Richard Thomas Jr. – cello
- Jackie Johnson – backing vocals (8)

== Charts ==
=== Weekly charts ===
Weekly chart performance for Saving Abel
Chart (2008–2009)	Peak position
Australian Albums (ARIA)	80
US Billboard 200	49
US Top Hard Rock Albums (Billboard)	4
US Heatseekers Albums (Billboard)	1
US Top Rock Albums (Billboard)	14

=== Year-end charts ===
2008 year-end chart performance for Saving Abel
Chart (2008)	Position
US Billboard 200	189

2009 year-end chart performance for Saving Abel
Chart (2009)	Position
US Billboard 200	122
US Top Rock Albums (Billboard)	49

== Certifications ==
Certifications for Saving Abel
Region	Certification	Certified units/sales
United States (RIAA)	Platinum	1,000,000^{‡}
^{‡} Sales+streaming figures based on certification alone.
