= Mystification =

Mystification may refer to:

- Mystification (sociology), seventh element identified by Erving Goffman in dramaturgy
- Mystification (Diderot), 1768 novella
- "Mystification", also known as "Von Jung", short story about dueling from Tales of the Grotesque and Arabesque by Edgar Allan Poe
- Mystification (2005 film) (fr), French film with Lucia Sanchez
- Mystification (2010 film) (pl), Polish film with Maciej Stuhr
- Mystification (album), 1987 album by Manilla Road

== See also ==
- Deception
