= Archetypes and Repetition =

Studio album by Deepfield
- Released: July 24, 2007
- Genre: Post-grunge; alternative rock
- Length: 39:13
- Label: In De Goot Recordings
- Producer: Paul Ebersold

Deepfield chronology
Archetypes and Repetition (2007)	Nothing Can Save Us Now (2011)

Professional ratings
Review scores
Source	Rating
AllMusic	2/5 stars

Archetypes and Repetition is the debut album from American rock band Deepfield. The album was released in 2007 by In De Goot Recordings.

== Singles ==
1. "Into The Flood"
2. "Don't Let Go"
3. "Get It"

== Track listing ==
No.	Title	Length
1.	"Innocence"	0:35
2.	"44 Teeth"	3:17
3.	"Get It"	2:51
4.	"Wayside"	3:38
5.	"Fall Apart"	4:05
6.	"The Bleeding"	3:31
7.	"Into The Flood"	3:24
8.	"Your Forever"	3:42
9.	"The Silence"	3:42
10.	"Dead Horse (The Love Between Us)"	3:05
11.	"Dreams"	4:00
12.	"Don't Let Go"	3:03
Total length:		38.53

== Personnel ==
- Baxter Teal - lead vocals, rhythm guitar
- Russell Lee - drums, percussion
- J. King - lead guitar
- Dawson Huss - bass guitar, backing vocals
