= Addicted (Saving Abel song) =

Single by Saving Abel

from the album Saving Abel
- Released: January 15, 2008
- Recorded: 2007
- Genre: Hard rock; post-grunge
- Length: 3:47
- Label: Virgin
- Songwriters: Jason Null; Jared Weeks; Skidd Mills
- Producer: Skidd Mills

Saving Abel singles chronology
"Addicted" (2008)	"18 Days" (2008)

Music videos
- "Addicted" (first version) on YouTube
- "Addicted" (second version) on YouTube

"Addicted" is the debut single by the American rock band Saving Abel, which appeared on their self-titled debut studio album as the second track. The single was released in January 2008 through Virgin Records, and it was produced by Skidd Mills for Skiddo Music, LLC.

== Certification and reception ==
In February 2009, "Addicted" was certified Platinum by the RIAA and later certified five-times Platinum in 2026. It was also placed at number 97 on Billboard's Top Hot 100 Hits of 2008. Co-writer Skidd Mills won a BMI Pop Award for "most played song" for Saving Abel's "Addicted".

On January 12, 2009, "Addicted" debuted at number 93 on the Australian ARIA Singles Chart, and later entered the top 50 at number 48. In the United States, it has reached number 20 on the Billboard Hot 100, becoming their first top-twenty hit. It was their only entry on either chart.

== Music videos ==
There are two official music videos for this song.

The first video released, directed by Anthony Honn, is a video shoot for many models, including some of them topless and in other suggestive positions. There is also a clean (edited) version of the video.

The second video, directed by Steven Oritt, features the band playing the song along with a man in his house watching a woman through binoculars in her house as she swims, takes a bath and dresses for a night out. While she is getting dressed, the man watching her sees a figure in dark clothes sneak up to her door, and creep in without knocking. The man panics, puts down the binoculars and picks up his keys. He drives to her house, and knocks on the door. He is surprised to see the hooded man on the other side of the door, with the girl he'd been watching right behind him. Embarrassed, he says nothing while the couple leaves holding hands.

== Charts ==
=== Weekly charts ===
Weekly chart performance for "Addicted"
Chart (2008–2009)	Peak position
Australia (ARIA)	36
Canada Hot 100 (Billboard)	44
Canada CHR/Top 40 (Billboard)	17
Canada Hot AC (Billboard)	32
Canada Rock (Billboard)	16
US Billboard Hot 100	20
US Adult Pop Airplay (Billboard)	10
US Alternative Airplay (Billboard)	7
US Mainstream Rock (Billboard)	2
US Pop Airplay (Billboard)	7

=== Year-end charts ===
2008 year-end chart performance for "Addicted"
Chart (2008)	Position
US Billboard Hot 100	97
US Alternative Airplay (Billboard)	12
US Mainstream Rock (Billboard)	3

2009 year-end chart performance for "Addicted"
Chart (2009)	Position
US Adult Top 40 (Billboard)	42

== Certifications ==
Certifications and sales for "Addicted"
Region	Certification	Certified units/sales
Canada (Music Canada)	Gold	20,000^{*}
New Zealand (RMNZ)	Gold	15,000^{‡}
United States (RIAA)	5× Platinum	5,000,000^{‡}
United States (RIAA) Mastertone	Platinum	1,000,000^{*}
^{*} Sales figures based on certification alone.^{‡} Sales+streaming figures based on certification alone.

== Release history ==
Release dates and formats for "Addicted"
Region	Date	Format(s)	Label	Ref.
United States	January 15, 2008	Digital download	Virgin	
United States	July 15, 2008	Contemporary hit radio	Capitol	
United States	September 30, 2008	Hot adult contemporary radio	Capitol	
United States	November 4, 2008	Digital download (acoustic version)	Virgin	
