= Piece of Me Tour =

2018 concert tour by Britney Spears

- Tour by Britney Spears
- Promotional poster for the tour
- Location: Europe; North America
- Start date: July 12, 2018
- End date: October 21, 2018
- Legs: 3
- No. of shows: 31
- Supporting act: Pitbull
- Attendance: 260,531
- Box office: US$54.3 million (Note: US$69.62 million in 2025 dollars.)

Britney Spears concert chronology
- Britney: Live in Concert (2017); Piece of Me Tour (2018)

The Piece of Me Tour (also referred to as Piece of Me: Exclusive Limited Tour) was the tenth concert tour by American entertainer Britney Spears. Although it largely mirrors her Las Vegas residency, Britney: Piece of Me, which concluded in December 2017; the stage-show was updated with new remixes, production technology, visuals and set list modifications to accommodate for arena shows.

After performing 11 shows during the summer of 2017 in Asia, under a concert tour titled Britney: Live in Concert, the show was adapted to be performed in various select cities across North America and Europe. The tour was announced in January 2018, and began in July. The tour ranked at numbers 86 and 30 on Pollstar's 2018 Year-End Top 100 Tours chart both in North America and worldwide, respectively. In total, the tour grossed $54.3 million with 260,531 tickets sold and was the sixth highest-grossing female tour of 2018, and was the United Kingdom's second best-selling female tour of 2018.

On September 5, 2018, it was announced that the tour was nominated for People's Choice Concert Tour of 2018 at the 44th People's Choice Awards.

== Background ==
Following the release of Spears' ninth studio album, Glory, she expressed interest in performing internationally again. In March 2017, after several publications began leaking details about Spears' planned international shows, she confirmed the planned tour by announcing concert dates in the Philippines and Israel. In the weeks following the announcement, Spears revealed additional Asian tour dates. Spears performed in the Philippines, Taiwan, Thailand, Hong Kong and Israel for the first time during the tour. A special tour edition of her ninth studio album was released on May 31, to coincide with the start of the tour.

On December 22, 2017, Spears announced she will be bringing the show to Denmark for the Smukfest. On January 23, 2018, Spears announced dates for North America and Europe. On February 13, 2018, Spears announced additional dates for the UK and Paris. Spears also announced Pitbull will join her across selected dates in Europe.

Shows in the United States are sponsored by PepsiCo, while the UK shows are sponsored by Britney Spears Fragrances.

In a court testimony regarding her conservatorship in June 2021, Spears revealed she was forced by her management to do the Piece of Me Tour, citing that they claimed they could sue her if she did not follow through with it, going against her wishes of taking a break from performing after her four-year run in Las Vegas. In an earlier court testimony leaked by The New York Times, Spears added that her management also forced her to go through a concert despite her having a 102 °F fever, with fans later pointing out that this concert was likely one of the Atlantic City stops of the tour.

== Critical reception ==
The tour received polarized reviews throughout its run. Cristina Jerome from the Miami New Times stated "The Piece of Me Tour was for Britney Spears' day-one fans. The Princess of Pop allowed her audience to experience her career from the late '90s to the present day while sprinkling in a few hits from her latest studio album, Glory." Although complementing Spears' show production and stage presence, accusations of lip-syncing were mentioned. In defence of Spears' lip-syncing accusations, Louis Staples from The Independent reviews the record-breaking Brighton Pride concert; "It is Spears' strength and vulnerability in the face of her troubles that most endears her to her fans. She is instantly forgiven for things that would normally sink other stars, such as her well-known aversion to live singing." Later mentioning that fans attend purely for the hits and "her glittery performance[s] proves that few people can match her cultural impact, or personify the words "icon" or "megastar" quite like her. Twenty years on, people still want a piece of Spears."

== Commercial performance ==
Demand in Europe and the United Kingdom saw ticket sites crashing, sparking Spears to add additional dates in London, Blackpool and Paris. Tickets were sold-out in under ten minutes for her date at 3Arena in Dublin; however, with a strict touring schedule, no additional date was added. The tour was named the second best-selling female tour in the United Kingdom in 2018, according to StubHub, only behind Taylor Swift's Reputation Stadium Tour. In Oslo, the Piece of Me Tour was performed to over 20,000 spectators, making it one of Spears' highest European (excluding the United Kingdom) concert-attendances in her touring history.

The concert in Bethlehem set a new record for the venue (previously held by The 1975), for the fastest-selling tickets in the venue. Spears' first date as part of her European leg was the Brighton Pride Festival, which was attended by a record-breaking crowd of 57,000 at Brighton's Preston Park. On August 11, 2018, Spears performed for 10,951 fans at Göransson Arena, Sweden, and broke the 10,500-record set by Scorpions in 2012.

On September 26, 2018, Spears was ranked at #17 on Pollstar's Concert Pulse with $13.1 million gross and 100,891 tickets sold in eight cities. This total are including two nights at Radio City Music Hall in New York City, which sold 11,887 tickets and grossed $2.7 million, three shows at Hard Rock Live in Hollywood, which sold 9,756 tickets and grossed $1.98 million, Mohegan Sun Arena in Uncasville, which sold 6,998 tickets and grossed $946,100 and the first report from the 18-date European tour at Antwerps Sportpaleis in Belgium, which sold out 16,787 tickets and grossed $1.4 million.

The Piece of Me Tour ranked at 86 and 30 on Pollstar's 2018 Year-End Top 100 Tours chart both in North America and worldwide, respectively. In total, the tour grossed $54.3 million with 260,531 tickets sold and was the sixth highest-grossing female tour of 2018, and was the United Kingdom's second best-selling female tour of 2018.

== Set list ==
This set list is representative of the show on July 12, 2018, in National Harbor, Maryland. It is not intended to represent all shows.

1. "Work Bitch"
2. "Womanizer"
3. "Break the Ice"
4. "Piece of Me"
5. "...Baby One More Time"
6. "Oops!... I Did It Again"
7. "Me Against the Music"
8. "Gimme More"
9. "Clumsy"
10. "Change Your Mind (No Seas Cortes)"
11. "Boys"
12. "Do You Wanna Come Over?"
13. "Work It" / "Get Ur Freak On" / "WTF (Where They From)" (dance break)
14. "I'm a Slave 4 U" (contains elements of "Walk It Talk It")
15. "Make Me"
16. "Freakshow"
17. "Do Somethin'"
18. "Circus"
19. "If U Seek Amy"
20. "Breathe on Me"
21. "Slumber Party"
22. "Touch of My Hand"
23. "Toxic"
24. "Stronger"
25. "(You Drive Me) Crazy"

Encore

26. "Till the World Ends"

Notes

- Starting on August 8, "Slumber Party" and "Touch of My Hand" were removed from the set list.

== Tour dates ==
List of concerts, showing date, city, country, venue, opening acts, tickets sold, number of available tickets and amount of gross revenue
Date	City	Country	Venue	Opening act	Attendance	Revenue
Leg 1 — North America
July 12, 2018	Oxon Hill	United States	MGM National Harbor Theater	—N/a	5,357 / 5,538	$1,555,048
July 13, 2018	Oxon Hill	United States	MGM National Harbor Theater	—N/a	5,357 / 5,538	$1,555,048
July 15, 2018	Uncasville	United States	Mohegan Sun Arena	—N/a	6,998 / 7,088	$946,100
July 17, 2018	Bethlehem	United States	Sands Bethlehem Center	—N/a	1,883 / 1,883	$766,222
July 19, 2018	Atlantic City	United States	Borgata Event Center	—N/a	5,952 / 5,952	$1,363,677
July 20, 2018	Atlantic City	United States	Borgata Event Center	—N/a	5,952 / 5,952	$1,363,677
July 21, 2018	Atlantic City	United States	Borgata Event Center	—N/a	5,952 / 5,952	$1,363,677
July 23, 2018	New York City	United States	Radio City Music Hall	—N/a	11,754 / 11,754	$2,840,121
July 24, 2018	New York City	United States	Radio City Music Hall	—N/a	11,754 / 11,754	$2,840,121
July 27, 2018	Hollywood	United States	Hard Rock Event Center	—N/a	9,653 / 9,783	$1,870,943
July 28, 2018	Hollywood	United States	Hard Rock Event Center	—N/a	9,653 / 9,783	$1,870,943
July 29, 2018	Hollywood	United States	Hard Rock Event Center	—N/a	9,653 / 9,783	$1,870,943
Leg 2 — Europe
August 4, 2018 (Note: The concert of August 4, 2018, at Preston Park in Brighton is a part of Brighton Pride.)	Brighton	England	Preston Park	—N/a	—N/a	—N/a
August 6, 2018	Berlin	Germany	Mercedes-Benz Arena	Pitbull	13,735 / 13,735	$1,045,280
August 8, 2018 (Note: The concert of August 8, 2018, at Skanderborg Dyrehave in Skanderborg is a part of Smukfest.)	Skanderborg	Denmark	Skanderborg Dyrehave	—N/a	—N/a	—N/a
August 10, 2018	Oslo	Norway	Telenor Arena	Pitbull	20,423 / 20,423	$1,838,118
August 11, 2018	Sandviken	Sweden	Göransson Arena	Pitbull	10,951 / 10,951	$975,742
August 13, 2018	Mönchengladbach	Germany	Sparkassenpark	Pitbull	15,208 / 15,208	$1,167,490
August 15, 2018	Antwerp	Belgium	Sportpaleis	Pitbull	17,246 / 19,911	$1,351,033
August 17, 2018	Scarborough	England	Open Air Theatre	Pitbull	7,888 / 7,888	$787,539
August 18, 2018	Manchester	England	Manchester Arena	Pitbull	13,780 / 13,780	$1,472,230
August 20, 2018	Dublin	Ireland	3Arena	Pitbull	12,510 / 12,510	$1,124,171
August 22, 2018	Glasgow	Scotland	SSE Hydro	Pitbull	10,623 / 10,623	$978,782
August 24, 2018	London	England	The O_{2} Arena	Pitbull	40,611 / 44,171	$4,540,070
August 25, 2018	London	England	The O_{2} Arena	Pitbull	40,611 / 44,171	$4,540,070
August 26, 2018	London	England	The O_{2} Arena	Pitbull	40,611 / 44,171	$4,540,070
August 28, 2018	Paris	France	AccorHotels Arena	Pitbull	—N/a	—N/a
August 29, 2018	Paris	France	AccorHotels Arena	Pitbull	—N/a	—N/a
August 31, 2018	Birmingham	England	Genting Arena	Pitbull	7,213 / 7,213	$877,354
September 1, 2018	Blackpool	England	Blackpool Tower Headland	Pitbull	18,974 / 18,974	$1,830,042
Leg 3 — North America
October 21, 2018 (Note: The concert on October 21, 2018, at Circuit of the Americas in Austin is part of the 2018 USGP Weekend.)	Austin	United States	Austin360 Amphitheater	—N/a	—N/a	—N/a
Total					230,759 / 237,385 (97%)	$27,329,962
