= Clumsy (Britney Spears song) =

2016 promotional single by Britney Spears

Promotional single by Britney Spears

from the album Glory
- Released: August 11, 2016
- Studio: 158 Studios (Westlake Village, California); House of Blues Studio (Encino, California)
- Genre: Electro; disco; doo-wop
- Length: 3:03
- Label: RCA; Sony
- Songwriters: Talay Riley; Warren "Oak" Felder; Alex Niceforo
- Producers: Felder; Alex Nice

Audio video
- "Clumsy" on YouTube

"Clumsy" is a song recorded by American singer Britney Spears for her ninth studio album, Glory (2016). It serves as the record's second promotional single, being released on August 11, 2016, for digital download and streaming by RCA Records and Sony Music. It was provided as an instant gratification track for those who pre-ordered Glory. "Clumsy" was written by Talay Riley, Warren "Oak" Felder and Alex Niceforo, while production was handled by Felder and Alex Nice; Mischke Butler served as a vocal producer.

Musically, "Clumsy" portrays a "synth-laden" electro song which incorporates doo-wop hand claps, stomping drums, finger snaps, soulful vocal riffs and an electronic drop in its instrumentation. Spears also alludes to her 2000 single "Oops!... I Did It Again" during the track's breakdowns. The lyrical themes of the recording delve on sex and how the singer and her suitor are clumsy during intimate moments. Writers from AllMusic, The Boston Globe, musicOMH and Rolling Stone considered the track a highlight of Glory while the latter listed it as one of the best songs of 2016. Commercially, "Clumsy" charted at number 142 in France, where it remained for two weeks on the SNEP chart. Spears included "Clumsy" on the set list of her Piece of Me Tour (2018).

== Background and release ==
Even though Britney Spears' eighth studio album, Britney Jean (2013), had a lackluster commercial performance, her Las Vegas residency show, Britney: Piece of Me, was successful. In September 2014, she posted a picture of herself in a recording studio. During an interview with Extra, a month later, she said that she was working "very slowly, but progressively" on new music. In 2015, she released the single "Pretty Girls", which featured Iggy Azalea, but clarified that she did not have plans to release another studio album that year. She explained that her children were her priority rather than music.

In late 2016, while promoting her ninth studio album Glory, Spears said that she wanted to explore new musical styles. She described the project as her "most hip-hop album," explaining, "[...] there are like two or three songs that go in the direction of more urban that I've wanted to do for a long time now, and I just haven't really done that." She collaborated with Talay Riley, who had previously co-written Iggy Azalea's "Bounce" (2013) and Nick Jonas' "Levels" (2015). After the release of the first single "Make Me..." and the promotional single "Private Show" on August 8, 2016, Spears and PopCrush announced that "Clumsy" was going to be made available as the second promotional track from the Glory as an instant grant for those who pre-ordered the album. It was subsequently released on August 11, 2016, for digital download and streaming.

== Composition ==
'Clumsy' is really cool, this was done in the middle of the process of the record and I wanted something really funky and this track came out of really nowhere and we brought it home. We got guys in the studio and we clapped and dosey-do and made it really bluesy and funky and did everything really old school and real.

— Spears commenting about "Clumsy" for SiriusXM.

"Clumsy" was written by Talay Riley, Warren "Oak" Felder and Alex Niceforo, with production being handled by the latter two; Mischke Butler served as a vocal producer. Spears, Riley, Felder, Zaire Koalo, Trevor Brown and Butler provided crowd vocals on the track, which were recorded at 158 Studios, Westlake Village, California, and at House of Blues Studio, Encino, California. Musically, "Clumsy" portrays a "synth-laden" electro track, with a "folksy verse stomp" and a "futuristic club beat." It additionally incorporates "stomping drums and finger snaps" in its instrumentation, as well as doo-wop "hand-claps and soulful vocal riffs as it builds to an explosive electronic drop." In an interview with radio show The Cooper Lawrence Show, the singer confirmed that she and her team "literally went into the booth together and did all the claps [...] all the sound effects are real, they're from us, our feet and everything, it's all real, so we all did it together, it's like very old-school." Joey Nolfi, writing for Entertainment Weekly, saw "Clumsy" as being " sonically in-line with songs heard on 2011's Femme Fatale and 2013's Britney Jean." The Guardian's Alex Macpherson opined that "its rapacious giddiness shares something of the same spirit as Ariana Grande's 'Greedy'."

Lyrically, the recording finds Spears "[fumbling] through the early throes of love." Adam R. Holz of Plugged In (publication) claimed that the song is "about Spears and a partner 'bangin' all over [the] bedroom,' which can be seen in the lines, "Clumsy, bangin' all over this bedroom again and again." Sasha Geffen of MTV added that during the track, Spears shows off her "flirty side" with lines like, "I love how you go down." Spin's Andrew Unterberger explained that the lyrics of "Clumsy" "offer varying degrees of double-entendred literalness within the clumsiness conceit, as Britney’s lack of physical dexterity leads to her 'slippin’ off this dress." Writing for Bustle, Alexis Rhiannon noticed that the text of the recording is "frankly pretty filthy" and "also essentially a description of pure sex." For the pre-chorus, Spears sings, "Call me a fool/ Call me insane/ But don't call it a thing/ Closer to you/ Closer to pain/ It's better than far away", following which she repeats "clumsy" as a hook. During every breakdown of the track, the singer "playfully squeals", "Oops!", making reference to her 2000 song "Oops!... I Did It Again". Throughout the track, Spears delivers vocals in her "nasal come-on tone" as noted by Rolling Stone's Jon Blistein. The critic furthermore opined that the song "marks a rhythmic, almost swing-inspired turn for Spears."

== Critical reception ==
Rob Sheffield of Rolling Stone considered it "one moment that sums up the fantastic new Britney Spears album" and "a perfect Britney song, done and dusted in three minutes. Ooops, she did it again." Stephen Thomas Erlewine, writing for AllMusic, declared that "some of the highlights [on the album] are the silliest songs", citing "Clumsy" as an example and defining it as a "swinging" track. Josh Duboff of Vanity Fair felt "Clumsy" portrays "the most straight-forward 'club' track" and further explained that "the song is innocuous and propulsive." Digital Spy's Lewis Corner named the recording a "four-to-the-floor banger" [...] with an infectious clap-beat." Andrew Unterberger of Spin stated that "the rubbery track is among Britney’s most fun songs of recent years." Alexis Rhiannon of Bustle, declared, "It's both a relief and a joy to hear Spears return to her former glory with the empowering, x-rated 'Clumsy' lyrics." Maura Johnston of Boston Globe labelled "Clumsy" as a highlight from Glory.

Neil McCormick of The Telegraph classified the track as "equating clumsiness with bumping and grinding sex," where "[Spears] switches back and forth between the two approaches so frequently that it almost sound like a duet between sweet and tough alter egos." The National's Si Hawkins confessed that "Clumsy" is "a return to quirky form," while John Murphy of musicOMH emphasized that the song was an "undoubted highlight". While noting that "Britney holds her own on the sexually charged 'Clumsy'," Sal Cinquemani of Slant Magazine suggested that Christina Aguilera would match better with the recording. Entertainment Weekly's Nolan Feeney observed that "the generic bass drop" of the track is a "missed opportunity." Alex Macpherson of The Guardian was largely positive towards "Clumsy", mentioning that it "brings out grinding, Justice-style metallic synths, verses that jitter and hop uncontrollably, beery chants and an absurd moment when Spears' voice gets pitch-shifted thither and yon. But if much of her post-Blackout work seems to have had an absence of character as its end goal, [...] Spears sounds like she’s having the time of her life sparring with and riding the kitchen-sink beat.

"Clumsy" was ranked at number 34 on Rolling Stone’s "50 Best Songs of 2016" list by Rob Sheffield, who said that "[the song was a] should-been-a-hit highlight from [Spears's] comeback album". He went on to say that "no singer [had] ever brought that much resonance to the word "oops"" referring to the song's lyrics and considered Britney a "TRL princess turned Vegas queen [who was revisiting] the high-energy disco-ball hysteria of her youth".

== Credits and personnel ==
Credits adapted from the liner notes of Glory.

Recording

- Vocals recorded at 158 Studios, Westlake Village, California; House of Blues Studio, Encino, California
- Mixed at Larrabee Studios, North Hollywood, California

Personnel

- Britney Spears – songwriter, lead vocals, crowd vocals
- Talay Riley – songwriter, crowd vocals
- Warren "Oak" Felder – songwriter, producer, crowd vocals
- Alex Niceforo – songwriter, producer
- Mischke Butler – vocal producer, crowd vocals
- Benjamin Rice – additional vocal recording
- Trevor Brown – crowd vocals
- Zaire Koalo – crowd vocals
- Benjamin Rice – vocal recording
- Benny Faccone – recording assistant
- Erik Belz – recording assistant
- Jaycen Joshua – mixing
- Maddox Chhim – mixing assistant
- Dave Nakaji – mixing assistant

== Charts ==
Chart (2016)	Peak position
France (SNEP)	142
South Korea Foreign (Circle)	91
