= Do You Wanna Come Over? =

2016 promotional single by Britney Spears

Promotional single by Britney Spears

from the album Glory
- Released: August 18, 2016
- Studio: 158 Studios (Westlake Village, CA); Studio at the Palms (Las Vegas, NV); Wolf Cousins Studios (Stockholm, Sweden)
- Genre: Dance-pop; electropop
- Length: 3:22
- Label: RCA
- Songwriters: Mattias Larsson; Robin Fredriksson; Julia Michaels; Justin Tranter; Sandy Chila
- Producer: Mattman & Robin

Audio video
- "Do You Wanna Come Over?" on YouTube

"Do You Wanna Come Over?" is a song recorded by American singer Britney Spears for her ninth studio album, Glory (2016). It was written by Mattias Larsson, Robin Fredriksson, Julia Michaels, Justin Tranter and Sandy Chila, and produced by Mattman & Robin. The song was released as the third promotional single from the album on August 18, 2016, as an instant grat track for those who pre-ordered the album and for streaming. "Do You Wanna Come Over?" is a dance-pop and electropop song, with subtle keyboards, a strummed guitar and wobbly bass in its instrumentation.

Lyrically, the song talks about a flirtation between two people, where the protagonist asks for a casual relationship and offers several options and reasons for her lover to hook up with her. The chorus of the song features a "shouted gang" of backup singers, with Spears repeating what they sing. Well received, the writers of AllMusic, The Boston Globe, Entertainment Weekly, musicOMH, and Vice considered the song a highlight of Glory. Entertainment Weekly and Billboard ranked it among the best songs of 2016. It has charted in the low regions of France, where it remained for two weeks on the SNEP charts. Spears has performed the track live during her Las Vegas residency show, Britney: Piece of Me, Today and 2016 iHeartRadio Music Festival.

== Background and release ==
She interprets the story – whether she's talking about fun and sex or talking about heartbreak, you feel it. [She gives] voice for days. The voice is so specific but it never ends – there's endless possibilities.

— Tranter commenting about Spears.

After the commercial lackluster of her eighth studio album, Britney Jean (2013), Spears started her Las Vegas residency show, Britney: Piece of Me, which attained commercial success. Later, in September 2014, Spears posted a picture of herself in the studio, hinting that she was recording new music. In another interview, a month later, she revealed that she was working "very slowly, but progressively" on the album. In 2015, she released the song "Pretty Girls" with Iggy Azalea, however the song was met with moderate impact and Spears headed back to the studio to record more songs, but didn't have plans to release a new album. In November 2015, Spears teased on her Instagram account that she was working with songwriters Justin Tranter and Julia Michaels, by posting a picture of them looking "bemused" with the caption: "Working hard and hardly working...new album...wheeeee!." A month later, Tranter gave an interview for website NewNowNext about his work with Spears and commented: "Working with Britney is a fucking dream. She is so sweet, so inspiring and a master on the mic. Me and Julia had to leave the studio one day because our screams of excitement after every take she did were distracting the producers."

In late 2016, during interviews to promote the album, Spears declared that she wanted to explore new things on the record, and that it was her "most hip-hop album," explaining: "[...] there are like two or three songs that go in the direction of more urban that I've wanted to do for a long time now, and I just haven't really done that." In May 2016, in an exclusive interview for website Breathe Heavy, Tranter revealed: "Nobody ever talks about Britney as a writer and she’s f**king great, like insane. Her concepts were bold and smart and very left of centre, in a good way. Melodically, she has melodies for days. How come no one mentions that this girl can write the f**k out of a song?. [...] "We got to work with her a bunch of times. She's the sweetest. A couple [of songs] we wrote on our own and then she wanted to write with us. She's an amazing writer." After the release of first single "Make Me..." and the promotional singles "Private Show" and "Clumsy", Spears announced on August 15, 2016, through her Twitter account that "Do You Wanna Come Over?" was going to be released three days later. On August 18, 2016, the song was released as the third and final promotional single, being available as an instant grat for those who pre-ordered the album, as well as for streaming. On December 7, 2016, it was widespread in media that Spears and Christina Aguilera would be featured on a potential remix for the song, after the Australasian Performing Right Association registered the singers as performers of the song.

== Composition ==
I think it's like electrically, just the track is really different. We use a lot of guitar, which I really like guitar, I like a lot of Aerosmith. It also has a really funky beat that intertwines with the whole thing and makes it really different and interesting.

"Do You Wanna Come Over?" was written by Mattias Larsson, Robin Fredriksson, Julia Michaels, Justin Tranter and Sandy Chila, with production being done by Mattman & Robin. Mattman & Robin were also responsible for programming, drums, percussion, snaps, handclaps, synths, guitars, bass and kalimba, while Michaels and Jermaine Jackson provided background vocals. It was recorded at 158 Studios, Westlake Village, California, The Studio at the Palms, Las Vegas, Nevada, and at Wolf Cousins Studios, Stockholm, Sweden. "Do You Wanna Come Over?" is a dance-pop and electropop song that lasts for three minutes and twenty-two seconds (3:22). It features "subtle keyboards, a strummed guitar," and "wobbly bass" in its instrumentation. For Brian Josephs of Spin, the song's guitar slaps "recall her 2001 single 'I'm a Slave 4 U.'" Other critics also felt that the "strummed flamenco guitar" on the song is similar to those on Justin Timberlake's "Like I Love You". Bianca Gracie of Fuse opined that the song reminded her of "the glory days (no pun intended) of Circus and Femme Fatale."

Lyrically, "Do You Wanna Come Over?" is a flirty song about Spears "offer[ing] several reasons why her lover should come over and options, which can be seen in the lines "Nobody should be alone if they don't have to be" and "I could get into that kissin' and touchin'/Or we could be good and do next to nothin'." Amy Roberts of Bustle noted that the lyrics are about hooking up, adding that they "celebrate the idea that casual relationships don't need to be lacking respect or understanding. You don't have to be in love with, or committing to, the person that you're hooking up with, but that also doesn't mean that you can't connect with them on a different level than just sex. In fact, Spears makes it clear that it's kind of even cool if her hook-up doesn't want to have sex. Her partner can draw the boundaries of where the massage she's offering starts and ends, and if it remains as nothing more than a back rub then so be it – that's totally cool." For Sal Cinquemani of Slant Magazine, the song features "some dubious lyrics that seem to suggest masturbatory self-love" in the lines: "All I want is what you want/And all you want is me." The chorus of the song features "a shouted gang" of backup singers, singing: "Whatever you want/ whatever you need/[I'll] do it!."

== Critical reception ==
"Do You Wanna Come Over?" received positive reviews from music critics, with some praising its production and others picking it as an standout track from Glory. Lewis Corner of Digital Spy called it "a thumping pop anthem," praising Spears's "seductive vocal delivery." Gil Kaufman of Billboard named it a "fun, flirty" track. Bianca Gracie of Fuse described it as a "pulsating track [that] is a flirty booty call that is bound to own the dance floor." Sal Cinquemani of Slant Magazine called it "impeccably produced downstairs music," adding that it "is an irresistible slice of dance-pop, with an ebullient bassline and staccato acoustic guitar." Stephen Thomas Erlewine of AllMusic declared that "some of the highlights [on the album] are the silliest songs," citing "Do You Wanna Come Over"'s "overheated flamenco chorus" as an example. Maura Johnston of Boston Globe said the song was one of the album's high points, noting that the song "is jolted to life by the slashed guitars that helped make 'Toxic' a pop thrill."

John Murphy of musicOMH was positive while noting that the track "has a rush and urgency about it which marks it out as one of the album's best songs." Nolan Feeney of Entertainment Weekly also picked it as a highlight, praising the "acoustic guitars and gurgling bass lines [that] make for one freaky pop experiment." Alex Macpherson of The Guardian wrote that the song "takes the party back to Britney's heyday," praising the inclusion of the flamenco guitar. For Los Angeles Times writer Mikael Wood, the song "restore[s] some of the sonic invention that once defined Spears' biggest hits." Nick Levine, writing for NME, echoed the same thought, writing: "The lusty strut of ‘Do You Wanna Come Over?’ nods to her early-noughties Neptunes-produced hits." In his Vice column, Robert Christgau selected "Do You Wanna Come Over?" and "Clumsy" as his favorite tracks on the album. Amy Mackelden of Bustle elaborated about the track:

With a strong '90s vibe, an upbeat tempo, and a surprising rhythm, "Do You Wanna Come Over?" utilizes the best of Spears' talents. [...] "Do You Wanna Come Over?" embraces the current trend for songs that are musically complicated, that layer up their beats and sound effects, and feature multiple voices and infectious shouting during their choruses. Much like Hailee Steinfeld and Gwen Stefani's latest offerings, "Do You Wanna Come Over?" is melodic, has a fast tempo, and is instantly recognizable. And most importantly, it's fun.

== Live performances ==
On August 18, 2016, Spears added "Do You Wanna Come Over?", as well as "Make Me...", to the setlist of her Las Vegas residency show Britney: Piece of Me. Later, on September 1, 2016, a performance of the song was broadcast from Planet Hollywood in Las Vegas for Today. During the performance, she used "an outfit similar to her risqué costume from [the] 2016 VMA, while her backup dancers stood out in brightly-colored tank tops and shorts," as reported by Entertainment Weekly's Ruth Kinane. The song was also included in Spears's setlist for the iHeartRadio Music Festival on September 24, 2016. Spears also performed it at the KIIS-FM's Jingle Ball, 99.7 NOW's Triple Show and B96's Pepsi Jingle Bash during December 2016. Later, she performed it at the Apple Music Festival, which was held in United Kingdom.

According to rehearsal videos published at Spears's social media accounts in late 2018, "Do You Wanna Come Over?" was set to be performed at her planned residency, Britney: Domination, prior to its cancellation in January 2019.

== Accolades ==
Billboard named "Do You Wanna Come Over?" as one of the best pop songs of 2016.

| Publication | Rank | List |
|---|---|---|
| Entertainment Weekly | 23 | 100 Best Songs of 2016 |

== Credits and personnel ==
Credits adapted from the liner notes of Glory.

Recording

- Vocals recorded at 158 Studios, Westlake Village, California; The Studio at the Palms, Las Vegas, Nevada, and at Wolf Cousins Studios, Stockholm, Sweden
- Mixed at MixStar Studios, Virginia Beach, Virginia

Personnel

- Britney Spears – lead vocals, background vocals
- Mattman & Robin – songwriter, producer, programming, drums, percussion, snaps, handclaps, synths, guitars, bass, kalimba
- Julia Michaels – songwriter, additional background vocals
- Justin Tranter – songwriter
- Sandy Chila – songwriter
- Jermaine Jackson – additional background vocals
- Benny Faccone – recording assistant
- Jason Patterson – recording assistant
- Serban Ghenea – mixing
- John Hanes – engineering

== Charts ==
"Do You Wanna Come Over?" appeared for two weeks on France's SNEP singles chart, becoming the highest charting promotional single from Glory. It debuted at number one hundred thirty-five on the week of August 20, 2016, and later climbed to number one hundred thirty-four on August 27, 2016, becoming its peak position.

| Chart (2016) | Peak position |
|---|---|
| France (SNEP) | 134 |
| Hungary (Single Top 40) | 26 |
| South Korea Foreign (Circle) | 97 |

== Release history ==
| Region | Date | Format | Label | Ref |
|---|---|---|---|---|
| Worldwide | August 18, 2016 | Digital download; streaming | RCA | |
