= Britney: Live in Concert =

2017 concert tour by Britney Spears

- Continental tour by Britney Spears
- Location: Asia
- Start date: June 3, 2017
- End date: July 3, 2017
- Legs: 1
- No. of shows: 11

Britney Spears concert chronology
- Britney: Piece of Me (2013–17); Britney: Live in Concert (2017); Piece of Me Tour (2018)

Britney: Live in Concert was the ninth concert tour by American entertainer Britney Spears. The tour marks Spears' first international concert tour in six years, the last being the Femme Fatale Tour in 2011. The tour largely mirrors her Britney: Piece of Me residency in Las Vegas.

== Background ==
Rumors of a world tour began circulating in 2016, coinciding with the release of Spears' ninth studio album, Glory, when Spears expressed interest in performing internationally again. In March 2017, after numerous publications began leaking details about Spears' planned international shows, she confirmed the planned tour by announcing concert dates in the Philippines and Israel. Coincidentally, her show in Israel was held on the same day as the Labor Party's primary election, which caused the election to be moved to the next day due to an insufficient amount of security and traffic congestion from Spears' concert. In the weeks following the announcement, Spears revealed additional Asian tour dates. Spears performed in the Philippines, Taiwan, Thailand, Hong Kong and Israel for the first time during the tour. A special tour edition of her ninth studio album was released on June 9, to coincide with the start of the tour.

Following allegations of lip-syncing during her concerts, Spears addressed the accusations during an Israeli phone interview, stating: "I do have a little bit of playback, but there’s a mixture of my voice and the playback." However, critic responses to the veracity of these claims were mixed. Days after, Spears sang a live rendition of "Happy Birthday" during her show in Singapore.

On December 22, 2017, Spears announced she would be bringing the show to Denmark for the Smukfest. On January 23, 2018, Spears announced dates for North America and Europe under a concert tour named Piece of Me Tour.

== Commercial performance ==
The local media reported that Spears performed for around 55,000–60,000 fans at Hayarkon Park, Tel Aviv, on July 3. Due to the concert, the Israeli Labor Party delayed their election for a new chairperson by a day. It was originally scheduled for July 3, the same day as Spears's concert, but party officials feared traffic jams and that party members would choose the concert over finding a polling station. The first show at Impact Arena, Bangkok, was sold out in 45 minutes and due to the high demand an extra date was added on June 24. According to Sony Music Japan, the first Yoyogi National Gymnasium show drew a sold-out crowd of 12,000 fans.

== Set list ==
The following set list was obtained from the concert held on June 6, 2017; at the Osaka-jō Hall in Osaka, Japan. It does not represent all concerts for the duration of the tour.

1. "Work Bitch"
2. "Womanizer"
3. "Break the Ice"
4. "Piece of Me"
5. "...Baby One More Time"
6. "Oops!... I Did It Again"
7. "Me Against the Music"
8. "Gimme More"
9. "Boys"
10. "Do You Wanna Come Over?"
11. "Work It" / "Get Ur Freak On" / "WTF (Where They From)" (dance break)
12. "I'm a Slave 4 U" (contains elements of "Get Naked (I Got a Plan)")
13. "Make Me"
14. "Freakshow"
15. "Do Somethin'"
16. "Circus"
17. "If U Seek Amy"
18. "Breathe on Me"
19. "Slumber Party"
20. "Touch of My Hand"
21. "Toxic"
22. "Stronger"
23. "(You Drive Me) Crazy"

Encore

24. "Till the World Ends"

== Tour dates ==
List of concerts, showing date, city, country, venue, and attendance
Date (2017)	City	Country	Venue	Attendance
June 3	Tokyo	Japan	Yoyogi National Stadium	12,000 / 12,000
June 4	Tokyo	Japan	Yoyogi National Stadium	—N/a
June 6	Osaka	Japan	Osaka-jō Hall	—N/a
June 10	Seoul	South Korea	Gocheok Sky Dome	12,000 / 17,000
June 13	Taipei	Taiwan	TaiNEX	—N/a
June 15	Pasay (Note: Promoted as Manila.)	Philippines	Mall of Asia Arena	20,000 / 20,000
June 23	Bangkok	Thailand	Impact Arena	—N/a
June 24	Bangkok	Thailand	Impact Arena	—N/a
June 27	Hong Kong		AsiaWorld–Arena	14,000 / 14,000
June 30	Singapore		Singapore Indoor Stadium	7,800 / 7,800
July 3	Tel Aviv	Israel	Hayarkon Park	60,000 / 60,000
Total				125,800 / 130,800 (96%)
