= Glory (Britney Spears album) =

2016 studio album by Britney Spears

- 2016 standard and deluxe edition cover

Studio album by Britney Spears
- Released: August 26, 2016
- Recorded: 2014–2016
- Length: 41:27
- Languages: English; French; Spanish
- Label: RCA
- Producers: BloodPop; Burns; Cashmere Cat; DJ Mustard; Jason Evigan; Oak Felder; Andrew Goldstein; Oscar Görres; Ian Kirkpatrick; Mattman & Robin; Nick Monson; Alex Nice; Robopop; Lance Eric Shipp; Twice as Nice; Tramaine Winfrey

Britney Spears chronology
Britney Jean (2013)	Glory (2016)	Oops!...I Did It Again (Remixes and B-Sides) (2020)

Alternative cover
- 2020 deluxe edition cover

Singles from Glory
- 1. "Make Me" Released: July 15, 2016; 2. "Slumber Party" Released: November 17, 2016

Singles from Glory (Deluxe)
- 1. "Mood Ring" Released: July 10, 2020; 2. "Swimming in the Stars" Released: December 2, 2020; 3. "Matches" Released: December 18, 2020

Glory is the ninth studio album by American singer Britney Spears, released on August 26, 2016, through RCA Records. Developed over a two-and-a-half-year recording period following the release of Britney Jean (2013), the album marked a shift toward a more artist-driven process, with Spears taking a more active role in selecting material, shaping concepts, and contributing melodies. Dissatisfied with early sessions, she enlisted executive producer Karen Kwak, after which the project was reoriented toward a sound that recalled elements of her earlier work while prioritizing creative freedom and personal interest.

Glory is mainly rooted in dance-pop with prominent R&B and hip hop influences, as it moves away from the overt EDM approach of her previous album. Its production emphasizes lighter, nocturnal textures and places greater focus on Spears' vocals. Lyrically, the album is heavily centered on sexuality, as it frequently addresses the listener and depicts intimate scenarios across its tracklist. The songs explore a range of pop styles, including electro-pop, disco, soul, reggae-inspired rhythms, and Latin and Southern influences.

The album was preceded by the release of the lead single "Make Me", featuring G-Eazy, followed by "Slumber Party", which later received a remix featuring Tinashe. Spears promoted Glory through televised performances, interviews, and festival appearances in the United States and Europe. In 2020, the album was reissued in standard and deluxe forms, which added previously unavailable tracks and coincided with a resurgence in popularity driven by a fan-led campaign.

Upon release, Glory received generally positive reviews from critics, who frequently highlighted its production and Spears' more engaged vocal performances, with some describing it as a return to form after her previous releases. Commercially, the album charted at number one in the Czech Republic, Ireland, and Italy while reaching the top five in Argentina, Australia, Belgium, Brazil, Canada, Germany, Mexico, Portugal, Scotland, Spain, Switzerland, the United Kingdom, and the United States.

== Background and recording ==
"Pretty Girls" wasn't original. Britney wanted to do things that were fresh and unexpected this time. There was never a moment where she was given a song, and anybody said, "This is a hit. You have to sing it". Britney pursued the songs she wanted to do for herself. She came up with concepts and melodies. It's her baby. It's like being an athlete. If you're doing it that much, you're getting yourself into shape. She was always ready to work during the album sessions, and it was very important to her to be done by a certain time so she could pick up her boys from school.

— Executive producer Karen Kwak, describing the recording process of Glory

In August 2014, it was announced that Britney Spears had renewed her contract with RCA Records, and that she was writing and recording new music. The recording process for Glory took two and a half years. Six months into the recording, Spears was dissatisfied with the results. Karen Kwak was then brought onto the record as an executive producer, following the release of "Pretty Girls", and helped Spears to find "the most fun people to write with". Since Kwak wanted to recall the sounds of Spears's previous albums such as Blackout (2007) and In the Zone (2003), she chose the producers based on it. Talking about the album, Kwak stated that Spears pursued what she had desired for "herself", and then she "came up with concepts and melodies". In an interview with Billboard on March 12, 2015, Spears said that she was working on a new album "slowly but surely".

In April, Matthew Koma confirmed that he had worked on material for Glory. In July, Spears was again photographed working with writers Chantal Kreviazuk and Simon Wilcox alongside producer Ian Kirkpatrick. During the same period, DJ Mustard announced that he was working on the album, later revealed to be "Mood Ring", recorded on the previous month. Even though Spears was photographed working with producer Alex da Kid, his contributions did not make the cut for the album. In October, Spears was pictured working in the studio with Burns and Mischke Butler. Later that month, she teased the title for "Just Luv Me".

In March 2016, Spears said that she was being "more hands-on" with the album and that it is "the best thing I've done in a long time", though she noted that she was "not rushing anything" to let her fans "truly appreciate it." On Most Requested Live with Romeo, Spears revealed that it was her son who chose the title of the album. Retrospectively, Spears stated in 2022 that recording Glory allowed her to "get a spark back" amidst her restrictive conservatorship.

== Composition ==
Glory is primarily a dance-pop album with R&B and hip hop influences, moving away from the more overt EDM stylings of Spears's previous albums. As noted by Stephen Thomas Erlewine of AllMusic, it adopts a comparatively "lighter" tone than her earlier releases, with softer, nocturnal tracks like Ellie Goulding, which lean toward adult contemporary textures. Lyrically, the album is heavily centered on sexuality, as it frequently addresses the listener as "you" and depicts various scenarios across much of its tracklist. According to NME's Nick Levine, Glory steps back from the thumping EDM and midtempo sounds that characterized Britney Jean (2013).

On Glory, Spears returns to an electro-driven sound, contrasting with the approach of her previous release. When Spears was asked about the style of the album, she responded: "I'll just say this... We really explored some new things." She also noted that a few tracks explore a more urban direction she had long wanted to pursue.

=== Songs ===
The opening track, "Invitation" is a bedroom track, and Spears suggests she might get her "blindfold out" on it. "Do You Wanna Come Over?" echoes the feel of her early tracks produced by the Neptunes. "Make Me..." features a guest appearance from rapper G-Eazy, with elements of R&B. On "Private Show", Spears adopts a performative perspective, narrating what the Los Angeles Times described as a "spectacular" strip-club routine. Rolling Stone drew comparisons between "Man on the Moon" and "Alien" from Britney Jean, suggesting that both tracks highlight Spears's understated affinities with David Bowie. "Just Luv Me" is an EDM-infused club song, which incorporates acoustic-techno guitar textures reminiscent of Justin Bieber. A disco anthem "Clumsy" features doo-wop and electro elements.

An R&B song, "Slumber Party" focuses on reggae-inspired beat and sexual scenarios from Glory, constructed from the listener's perspective. The Boston Globe observed that the tone of "Just Like Me" recalls aspects of her earliest work. On "Love Me Down", compared to Gwen Stefani's style, Spears adopts a vocal delivery associated with Iggy Azalea and Fergie. The soul and electro-soul track, "What You Need", features vocal stylings likened to "faux-Ariana" pop inflections. On "Better", MusicOMH highlighted the left-field pop sensibility of the track, singling out BloodPop's production. While "Change Your Mind (No Seas Cortés)" features latin elements, "Liar" contains Southern-soul sounds which drew comparisons to Carrie Underwood. "If I'm Dancing" features a deliberately exaggerated faux-British accent. Slant Magazine wrote that "Coupure Électrique" would not sound out of place on Selena Gomez's Revival (2015).

== Release and promotion ==
=== Marketing ===
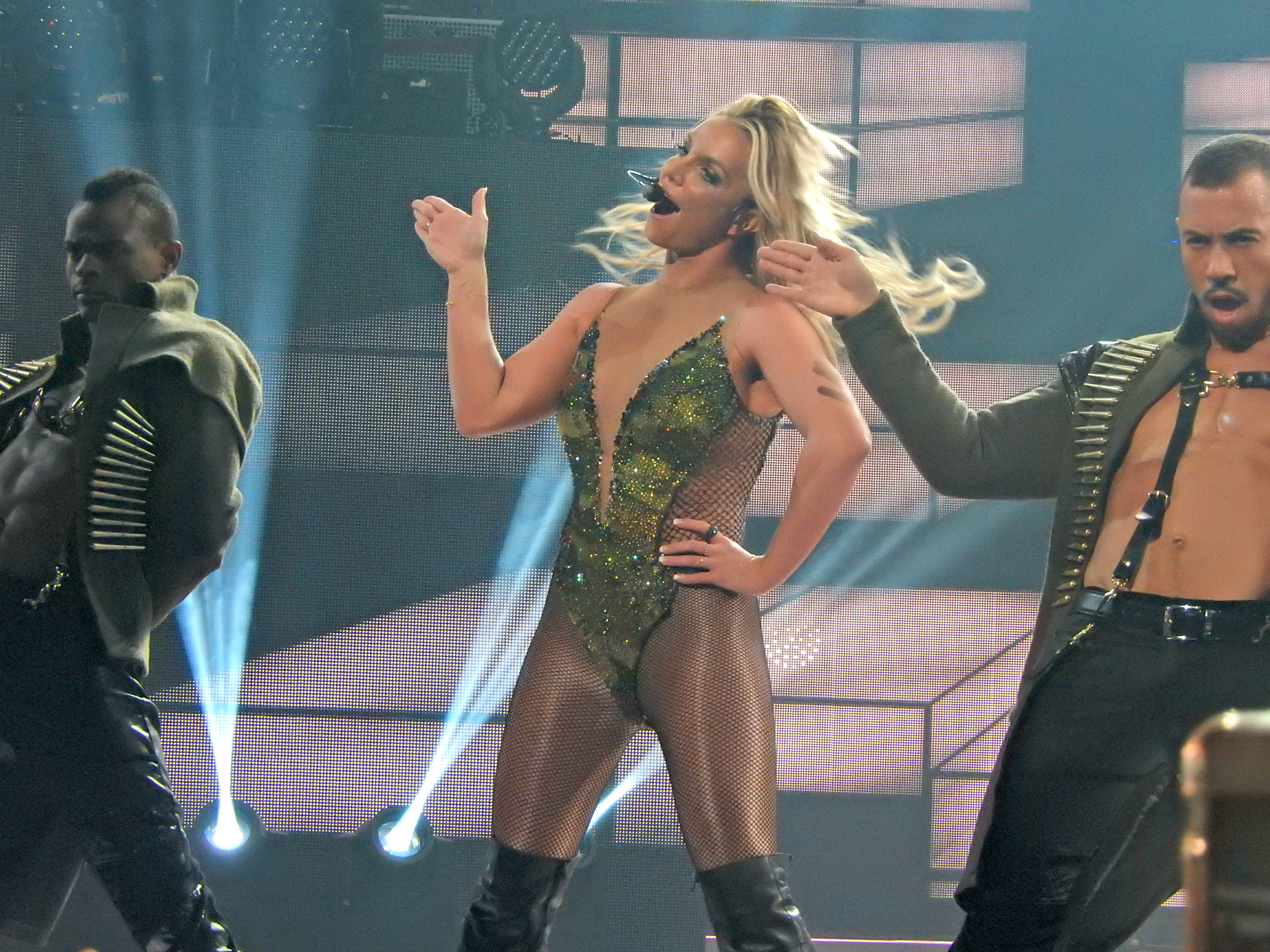
Spears performing at the 2016 Apple Music Festival at the Roundhouse in Camden Town, London, England, United Kingdom on September 27, 2016

On August 3, 2016, Spears unveiled Glory's release date, title, and cover art, tweeting the phrase "the beginning of a new era". That day, she appeared on Jimmy Kimmel Live!, pranking Jimmy Kimmel with an impromptu bedside performance of "Make Me" alongside male dancers. She also revealed that her new song "Private Show" would be instantly made available for digital download to those who pre-ordered the album via iTunes Store. On August 5, Spears was interviewed for the radio program On Air with Ryan Seacrest, where she discussed the development of Glory. On August 16, Spears announced that she would be performing "Make Me" at the 2016 MTV Video Music Awards. The performance was announced following the cancellation of two Britney: Piece of Me show dates that were initially scheduled two days prior to the awards. On August 24, she was interviewed on BBC's Scott Mills, and a day later, she appeared on the "Carpool Karaoke" segment on The Late Late Show with James Corden. On August 29, the day after the VMAs, she was interviewed on the Elvis Duran and the Morning Show and the Zach Sang Show.

On September 1, Spears appeared on American program Today to perform "Make Me" and "Do You Wanna Come Over?". She also appeared on The Ellen DeGeneres Show on September 7, where she went with Ellen DeGeneres to the mall and distributed signed copies of Glory. On September 24, Spears performed at the 2016 iHeartRadio Music Festival at the T-Mobile Arena, which aired on The CW. On September 27, she performed at the Apple Music Festival in London and appeared on The Jonathan Ross Show on October 1 for an interview and to perform "Make Me", marking her first performance on British TV since 2008. On December 2, she performed at 102.7 KIIS FM's Jingle Ball and "Slumber Party" with Tinashe. The following day, she performed at 99.7 NOW's Triple Ho Show. On December 10, Spears performed at the B96 Pepsi Jingle Bash.

=== Reissue ===
In 2020, Glory was reissued two times; the standard edition was reissued first, which was surprise released onto music streaming services on May 29. It contains the previously Japan-exclusive track "Mood Ring (By Demand)", as well as a new cover artwork. The deluxe edition received a reissue on December 4, featuring the new songs–"Swimming in the Stars" and "Matches"—the latter being a collaboration with the Backstreet Boys—alongside remixes of "Mood Ring". It also includes the original solo version of "Slumber Party" and the original album track order.

The reissues were in response to the original version of Glory receiving a resurgence in popularity in May 2020, following a fan-led social media campaign, which led it to chart at number one on the US iTunes album chart. Spears acknowledged the fan campaign via an Instagram video message, and unveiled a new cover artwork for the standard reissue. The revised cover features Spears laying in the middle of a desert wearing a gold bathing suit. Years after the release of the album, Spears announced her intention to step away from the music industry, although commentators note that this decision could be subject to change in the future.

=== Singles ===
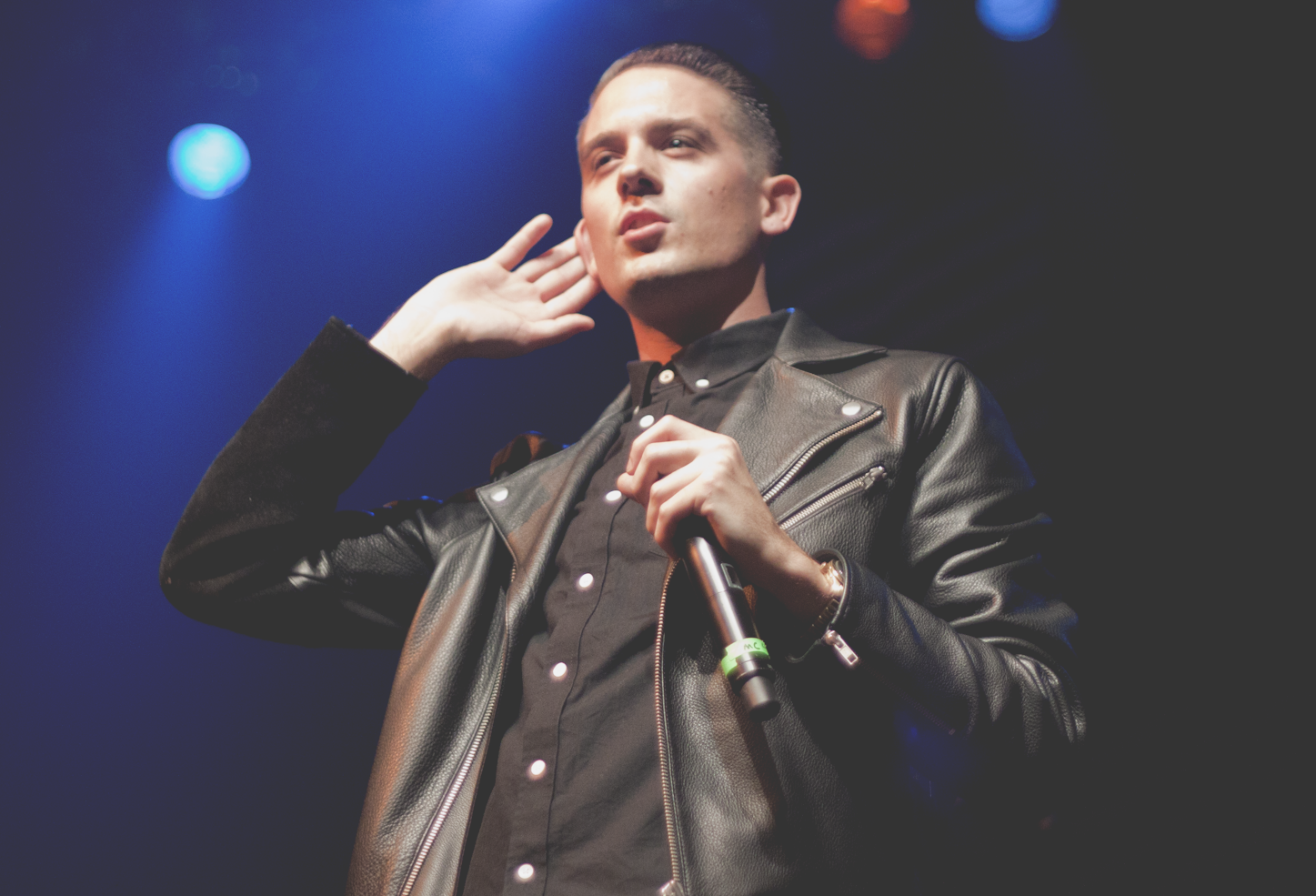
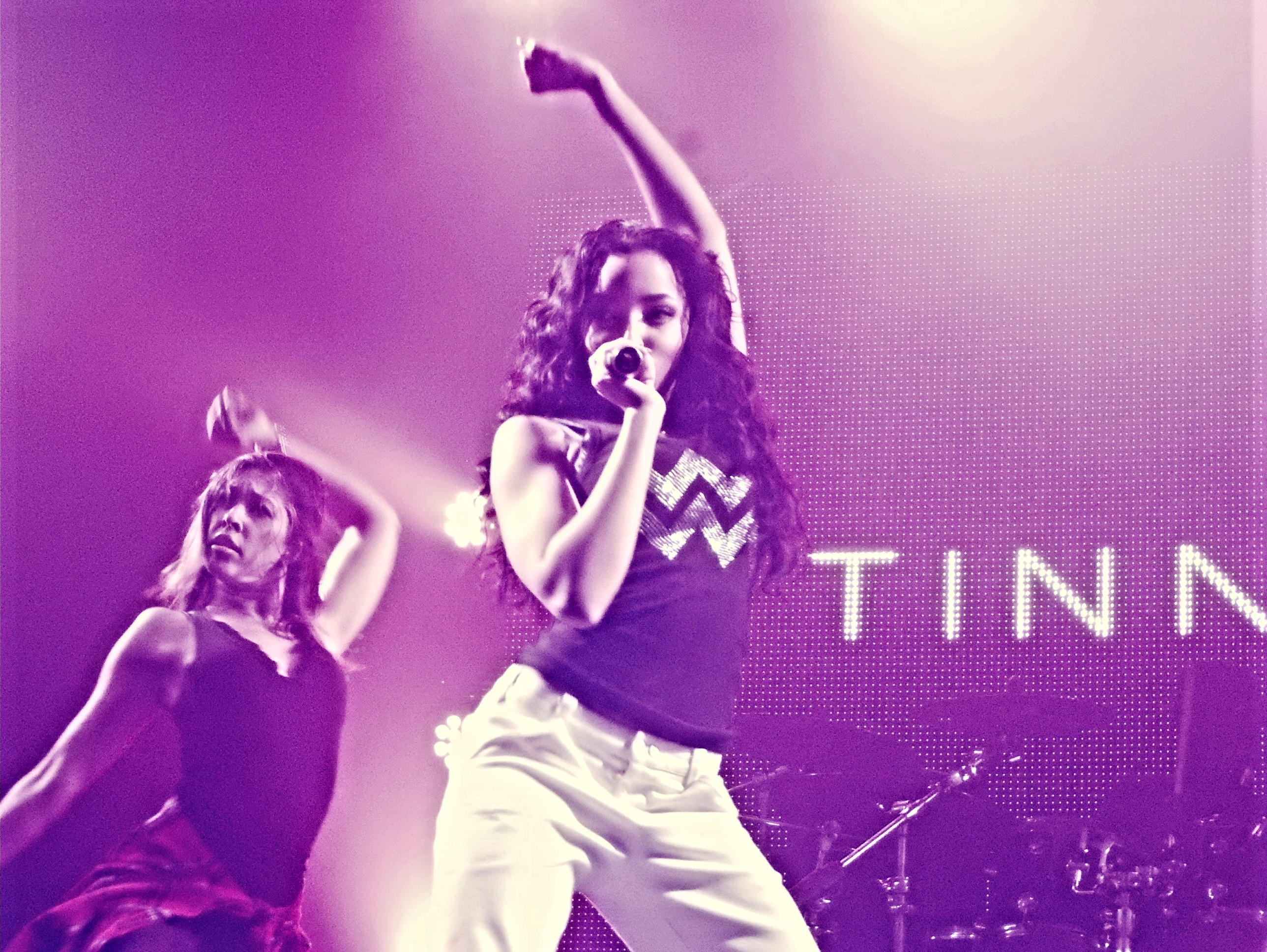
The rapper G-Eazy (left) featured on "Make Me", and the singer Tinashe (right) featured on the remix version of "Slumber Party".

"Make Me" was released as Glory's lead single on July 15, 2016, featuring the vocal collaboration of American rapper G-Eazy. An accompanying music video directed by David LaChapelle premiered at Spears's Vevo channel on August 5. The single debuted and peaked at number 17 on the US Billboard Hot 100, becoming her sixth-highest debut on the chart and 34th Hot 100 entry.

On October 25, Spears started to tease the second single, sharing part of the lyrics: "Neighbors say we're causing a commotion..." A remix version of "Slumber Party" featuring Tinashe was released on November 17. Its music video was directed by Colin Tilley and premiered at YouTube on the same day. The song debuted at number 86 on the Hot 100 issue dated December 10, becoming her 35th chart entry. Both "Make Me" and "Slumber Party" reached the summit of the US Dance Club Songs chart.

"Mood Ring (By Demand)" was released to Italian radio on July 10, 2020, as the lead single from the 2020 reissues and overall third single from Glory. "Swimming in the Stars" was released to digital on December 2, as the second single from the reissues and overall fourth single, coinciding with Spears's 39th birthday. The release took critics by surprise, having been released amidst the #FreeBritney movement and Spears's work hiatus. "Matches" was issued to contemporary hit radio in Italy on December 18, as the third single from the 2020 reissues and overall fifth and final single.

=== Promotional singles ===
"Private Show" was released as the first promotional single along with the pre-order on August 4, 2016. Written by Spears, Carla Williams, Tramaine Winfrey and Simon Smith, the song shares the title of her then-latest fragrance. "Clumsy" was released as the second promotional single on August 11. As the song was leaked earlier, fans could listen the song before its official release. The third and final promotional single, "Do You Wanna Come Over?", was released on August 18.

== Critical reception ==
Professional ratings
Aggregate scores
Source	Rating
AnyDecentMusic?	6.8/10
Metacritic	71/100
Review scores
Source	Rating
AllMusic	4/5 stars
The Boston Globe	80/100
The Daily Telegraph	3/5 stars
Entertainment Weekly	B
Los Angeles Times	80/100
NME	3/5
The New York Times	50/100
Rolling Stone	3.5/5 stars
Slant Magazine	3.5/5 stars
Vice	A−

Glory received mostly positive reviews from music critics, many of whom praised the album's production and called it her best studio effort in years. (Note: Attributed to multiple sources:) At Metacritic, the album received an average score of 71 out of 100, indicating "generally positive reviews", based on fourteen reviews.

Sal Cinquemani from Slant Magazine rated the album 3.5 out of 5 stars, and called the album's sound "daring and mature", but criticized "Private Show", calling it "the album's only bona-fide misfire." In a positive review, Maura Johnston from The Boston Globe described the album as one with "an unbridled energy" that "operates on its own terms." Neil McCormick from The Daily Telegraph praised the production on the album, and concluded that it "just might be Britney's masterpiece". In a mixed review of the album, Jon Pareles from The New York Times claimed that the album was "one-dimensional", but added Spears sounded like she "has emphatically returned to the foreground." Mesfin Fekadu from Associated Press noted Spears "has taken note and jumped on the bandwagon [of R&B]" but claimed that the songs were not "authentically Britney." In contrast, Nolan Feeney from Entertainment Weekly characterized the songs on the album as sounding "like glimpses of the real Britney—her musical tastes, her voice—imperfections and all."

In particular, Spears's vocals were generally praised. (Note: Attributed to multiple sources:) The Los Angeles Times described the vocals as a "vast improvement" over those on Britney Jean, remarking that "the very performed nature of the singing [...] makes Glory such a good time." The Boston Globe remarked that Spears was "throwing herself fully into her vocal performance" on the album, while The New York Times described Spears as sounding "more involved, more present, than she has in a decade." Rolling Stone positively compared Spears's vocals to those on In the Zone, saying "she hasn't played around with her vocals so cleverly since the 'Toxic' days." Entertainment Weekly described the album as "her most engaging vocally" in a decade and noted Spears as sounding "more present and enthusiastic than she has in years." Slant Magazine credited Spears with a "willingness to stretch vocally and explore new sonic terrain", but also remarked that at times, this "highlight[s] her shortcomings".

=== Accolades ===
List of accolades received
Publication	Accolade	Rank	Ref.
Slant Magazine	25 Best Albums of 2016	10	
Digital Spy	20 Best Albums of 2016	11	
Fuse	Best Albums of the Year 2016	9	
Glamour	20 Best Albums of the Year 2016	20	
AOL	Best Albums of 2016	5	
Rolling Stone	20 Best Pop Albums of 2016	5	
AllMusic	Favourite Pop Albums of 2016	5	

== Commercial performance ==
Glory debuted at number three on the US Billboard 200, moving 111,000 album-equivalent units including 88,000 pure copies. An increase of the sales was compared to her previous studio album, Britney Jean (2013), which sold 107,000 copies in its first week. The record marks Spears's ninth top five album in the nation. As of May 2020, the album has sold 157,000 copies in the United States. On the Canadian Albums Chart compiled by Billboard, the record debuted at number four with 9,000 consumption units, also marking her ninth top five album in the country.

In the United Kingdom, Glory debuted at number two, becoming her highest-charting album in the country since Blackout (2007). In Germany, the album debuted at number three, becoming her highest-charting album there in 13 years, since the release of In the Zone (2003). In Italy, the album debuted at number one, becoming Spears's first album to reach the top of the Italian album chart. The album also debuted at number one in Ireland and the Czech Republic. In Japan, the album peaked at number 19 on the Japanese Albums chart (Oricon) selling 2,725 copies, debuting on the Billboard Japan Hot Albums chart at number 33. In South Korea, the album debuted at number 26 on the Gaon Album Chart and at number three on the international version of the same chart. In June 2017, after Spears' tour in South Korea, the album rebounded on the Gaon International Chart and reached the top of the chart, higher than its debut position. In Brazil, it had sold over 20,000 copies during its first day of release. Additionally, the album also charted within the top ten of charts in various international countries. (Note: Attributed to multiple sources:)

== Track listing ==
Standard edition
No.	Title	Writer(s)	Producer(s)	Length
1.	"Invitation"	Britney Spears; Julia Michaels; Justin Tranter; Nick Monson	Monson; Mischke^{[a]}	3:19
2.	"Do You Wanna Come Over?"	Mattias Larsson; Robin Fredriksson; Michaels; Tranter; Sandy Chila	Mattman & Robin^{[b]}	3:22
3.	"Make Me" (featuring G-Eazy)	Spears; Burns; Joe Janiak; Gerald Gillum	Burns; Mischke^{[a]}	3:50
4.	"Private Show"	Spears; Carla Marie Williams; Tramaine "Young Fyre" Winfrey; Simon Smith	Winfrey; Mischke^{[a]}	3:55
5.	"Man on the Moon"	Jason Evigan; Ilsey Juber; Phoebe Ryan; Sterling Fox; Marcus Lomax	Evigan; Dan Book^{[c]}; Pat Thrall^{[c]}	3:46
6.	"Just Luv Me"	Daniel Omelio; Magnus August Høiberg; Michaels	Cashmere Cat; Robopop; Mischke^{[a]}	4:01
7.	"Clumsy"	Talay Riley; Warren "Oak" Felder; Alex Niceforo	Felder; Alex Nice; Mischke^{[a]}	3:02
8.	"Slumber Party"	Larsson; Fredriksson; Michaels; Tranter	Mattman & Robin^{[b]}; Mischke^{[a]}	3:34
9.	"Just Like Me"	Spears; Michaels; Tranter; Monson	Monson; Mischke^{[a]}	2:44
10.	"Love Me Down"	Andrew "Goldstein" Goldstein; Evan Kidd Bogart; Jesse St. John; Jessica Karpov	Goldstein; Mischke^{[a]}	3:18
11.	"Hard to Forget Ya"	Oscar Görres; Ian Kirkpatrick; Brittany Coney; Denisia Andrews; Edward Drewett	Görres^{[b]}; Kirkpatrick^{[d]}; Mischke^{[a]}	3:29
12.	"What You Need"	Spears; Williams; Winfrey; Smith	Winfrey; Mischke^{[a]}	3:07
Total length:				41:27

Deluxe edition
No.	Title	Writer(s)	Producer(s)	Length
13.	"Better"	Spears; Michaels; Tranter; Michael Tucker	BloodPop; Mischke^{[a]}	3:09
14.	"Change Your Mind (No Seas Cortes)"	Larsson; Fredriksson; Michaels; Tranter	Mattman & Robin^{[b]}; Mischke^{[a]}	2:59
15.	"Liar"	Evigan; Breyan Isaac; Danny Parker; Nash Overstreet	Evigan^{[b]}	3:16
16.	"If I'm Dancing"	Kirkpatrick; Simon Wilcox; Chantal Kreviazuk	Kirkpatrick^{[b]}; Mischke^{[c]}	3:24
17.	"Coupure Électrique"	Spears; Lance Eric Shipp; Nathalia Marshall; Rachael Kennedy	Shipp; Mischke^{[a]}	2:20
Total length:				56:35

2020 deluxe edition
No.	Title	Writer(s)	Producer(s)	Length
18.	"Mood Ring (By Demand)"	Dijon McFarlane; Nicholas Audino; Te Whiti Warbrick; Lewis Hughes; Jon Asher; Melanie Fontana	DJ Mustard; Twice as Nice^{[d]}; Asher^{[a]}	3:49
19.	"Swimming in the Stars"	Matthew Koma; Book; Alexei Misoul	Koma; Book; Emily Wright^{[a]}	3:21
20.	"Matches" (with Backstreet Boys)	Michael Wise; Asia Whiteacre; Tranter; Kirkpatrick	Wise; Kirkpatrick	2:47
21.	"Mood Ring (By Demand)" (Pride Remix)	McFarlane; Audino; Warbrick; Hughes; Asher; Fontana	DJ Mustard; Twice as Nice^{[d]}; Asher^{[a]}	3:13
22.	"Mood Ring (By Demand)" (Wuki Remix)	McFarlane; Audino; Warbrick; Hughes; Asher; Fontana	DJ Mustard; Twice as Nice^{[d]}; Asher^{[a]}	3:06
23.	"Mood Ring (By Demand)" (Ape Drums Remix)	McFarlane; Audino; Warbrick; Hughes; Asher; Fontana	DJ Mustard; Twice as Nice^{[d]}; Asher^{[a]}	3:41
Total length:				76:49

=== Notes ===
- ^{^[a]} signifies a vocal production
- ^{^[b]} signifies a primary and a vocal production
- ^{^[c]} signifies an additional vocal production
- ^{^[d]} signifies a co-production
- On digital editions of the album, "Do You Wanna Come Over?" is the seventh track after "Clumsy", prior to "Slumber Party", while the rest of the songs remain in the original order. It was mistakenly placed as track 7, its placement on the album's 2016 digital reissue, instead of track 2 on vinyl releases. All copies include a white sticker on the back cover pointing out this error.
- Album was reissued on November 16, 2016, on digital and streaming platforms to include a new version of "Slumber Party" that features Tinashe, which has the same length as the original version. The solo version was restored on the 2020 deluxe reissue edition.
- 2016 editions of the album (excluding Japanese releases) and the 2020 standard reissue are no longer available on digital platforms as of September 2022. The Japan exclusive editions and the 2020 deluxe reissue edition all currently remain available.
- Japan tour edition includes a bonus disc with tracks reproducing the set list of Britney: Live in Concert.
- The digital-only 2020 standard edition included "Mood Ring (By Demand)" as a bonus thirteenth track, following the 2016 digital standard reissue track listing. The 2020 standard digital reissue and all prior editions of the album, excluding the Japan editions, have since been delisted from digital platforms, in favor of the 2020 deluxe edition.

== Personnel ==
- Denisia Andrews – background vocals
- Jon Asher – vocal producer, background vocals
- Jessica Ashley – background vocals
- Venus Barr – keyboards, producer
- Erik Belz – assistant vocal engineer
- BloodPop – producer
- Julian Gramma – producer
- Dan Book – vocal producer
- Trevor Brown – background vocals
- Burns – engineer, producer
- Cashmere Cat – instrumentation, producer, programming
- Maddox Chhim – mixing assistant
- Brittany Coney – background vocals
- John Cranfield – engineer
- Alex DeGroot – assistant vocal engineer
- Aaron Dobos – vocal engineer
- Ed Drewett – background vocals
- Jason Evigan – instrumentation, producer, vocal engineer, vocal producer, background vocals
- Vanessa Evigan – background vocals
- Victoria Evigan – background vocals
- Benny Faccone – assistant engineer, assistant vocal engineer
- Oak Felder – producer, background vocals
- Robin Florent – mixing engineer
- Melanie Fontana – background vocals
- Ina Forsberg – background vocals
- Sterling Fox – guitar, background vocals
- Livvi Franc – background vocals
- Robin Fredriksson – bass, brass, drums, guitar, handclapping, kalimba, marimba, percussion, producer, programming, snaps, synthesizer, vocal engineer, vocal producer
- Michael Freeman – mixing assistant
- G-Eazy – rap vocals
- Chris Galland – mixing engineer
- Serban Ghenea – mixing
- Andrew Goldstein – engineer, keyboards, producer, programming
- Erwin Gorostiza – creative director
- Oscar Görres – bass, guitar, percussion, producer, programming, shaker, snaps, synthesizer, vocal engineer, vocal producer, background vocals
- Angella Grossi – background vocals
- John Hanes – engineer, mixing engineer
- Breyan Isaac – background vocals
- Jeff Jackson – mixing engineer
- Jermaine Jackson – background vocals
- Joe Janiak – background vocals
- Kathleen Janzen – background vocals
- Jaycen Joshua – mixing
- Ilsey Juber – background vocals
- Rob Katz – assistant vocal engineer
- Ian Kirkpatrick – producer, programming, background vocals
- Zaire Koalo – background vocals
- Dave Kutch – mastering
- Karen Kwak – A&R, executive producer
- Mattias Larsson – bass, brass, drums, guitar, handclapping, kalimba, marimba, percussion, producer, programming, snaps, synthesizer, vocal engineer, vocal producer
- Marcus Lomax – background vocals
- Kevin Luu – assistant engineer, assistant vocal engineer
- Manny Marroquin – mixing
- Nathalia Marshall – vocal production assistance
- Julia Michaels – background vocals
- Mischke Butler – vocal engineer, vocal producer, background vocals
- Nick Monson – producer
- David Nakaji – mixing assistant
- Alex Niceford – producer
- Randee St. Nicholas – photography
- Jason Patterson – assistant vocal engineer
- Phoebe Ryan – background vocals
- Linda Pritchard – background vocals
- Benjamin Rice – vocal engineer
- Talay Riley – background vocals
- Robopop – instrumentation, producer, programming
- James Royo – engineer
- Lance Shipp – podorythmie
- Venus Shipp – background vocals, assistant engineer
- Dawn Soul – background vocals, programming
- Britney Spears – lead vocals, background vocals
- Mark "Spike" Stent – mixing
- Gavin Taylor – art direction, design
- Isaiah Tejada – assistant engineer
- Pat Thrall – vocal producer
- Carla Marie Williams – background vocals
- Tramaine "Youngfyre" Winfrey – producer, background vocals
- Sadaharu Yagi – assistant vocal engineer

== Charts ==
=== Weekly charts ===
Chart (2016–2017)	Peak position
Argentine Albums (CAPIF)	5
Australian Albums (ARIA)	4
Austrian Albums (Ö3 Austria)	6
Belgian Albums (Ultratop Flanders)	3
Belgian Albums (Ultratop Wallonia)	4
Brazilian Albums (ABPD)	2
Canadian Albums (Billboard)	4
Croatian International Albums (HDU)	18
Czech Albums (ČNS IFPI)	1
Danish Albums (Hitlisten)	35
Dutch Albums (Album Top 100)	8
Estonian Albums (Eesti Ekspress)	8
Finnish Albums (Suomen virallinen lista)	8
French Albums (SNEP)	6
German Albums (Offizielle Top 100)	3
Greek Albums (IFPI)	21
Hungarian Albums (MAHASZ)	10
Irish Albums (IRMA)	1
Italian Albums (FIMI)	1
Japanese Albums (Oricon)	19
Japanese Albums (Oricon) Japan Tour Edition	67
Japanese Hot Albums (Billboard Japan)	33
Japanese International Albums (Oricon)	4
Mexican Albums (AMPROFON)	5
New Zealand Albums (RMNZ)	8
Norwegian Albums (VG-lista)	10
Polish Albums (ZPAV)	12
Portuguese Albums (AFP)	3
Scottish Albums (Official Charts)	4
Slovak Albums (ČNS IFPI)	95
South African Albums (RISA)	20
South Korean Albums (Gaon)	26
South Korean International Albums (Gaon)	1
Spanish Albums (Promusicae)	2
Swedish Albums (Sverigetopplistan)	12
Swiss Albums (Schweizer Hitparade)	4
UK Albums (Official Charts)	2
US Billboard 200	3

=== Monthly charts ===
Chart (2016)	Peak position
South American Albums (Prensario)	2
South Korean Albums (Gaon)	75
Uruguayan Albums (CUD)	11

=== Year-end charts ===
Chart (2016)	Position
Belgian Albums (Ultratop Wallonia)	142
Mexican Albums (AMPROFON)	87
South Korean International Albums (Gaon)	88
US Billboard 200	172

== Certifications and sales ==
Region	Certification	Certified units/sales
Brazil	—	20,000
Canada (Music Canada)	Gold	40,000^{‡}
France	—	10,500
South Korea (Gaon) (Note: Album sales from 2016 and 2017)	—	1,110
United States	—	157,000
Summaries
Worldwide	—	~400,000
^{‡} Sales+streaming figures based on certification alone.

== Release history ==
Region	Date	Edition(s)	Format(s)	Label(s)	Ref.
Various	August 26, 2016	Standard; deluxe	CD; digital download; LP; streaming	RCA	
South Korea	August 30, 2016	Standard; deluxe	CD	Sony Music	
Japan	September 14, 2016	Standard	CD	Sony Music	
Various	November 16, 2016	Reissue	Digital download; streaming	RCA	
Japan	May 31, 2017	Tour	Double CD	Sony Music	
China	June 18, 2017	Tour	Double CD	Sony Music	
Various	May 29, 2020	2020 standard	Digital download; streaming	RCA	
Various	December 4, 2020	2020 deluxe	LP	RCA	
Various	December 11, 2020	2020 deluxe	Digital download; streaming	RCA	

== See also ==
- List of 2016 albums
- List of number-one albums of 2016 (Ireland)
- List of number-one albums of 2016 (Italy)
- List of UK top-ten albums in 2016
