= Slumber Party (song) =

2016 single by Britney Spears

- Remix bundle artwork

Single by Britney Spears featuring Tinashe

from the album Glory
- Released: November 17, 2016
- Recorded: 2016
- Studio: 158 Studios (Westlake Village, California); Wolf Cousins Studios (Stockholm, Sweden); Conway Recording Studios (Los Angeles, California)
- Genre: Reggae-pop; R&B
- Length: 3:34
- Label: RCA
- Songwriters: Mattias Larsson; Robin Fredriksson; Julia Michaels; Justin Tranter
- Producer: Mattman & Robin

Britney Spears singles chronology
"Make Me..." (2016)	"Slumber Party" (2016)	"Mood Ring" (2020)

Tinashe singles chronology
"Company" (2016)	"Slumber Party" (2016)	"Text from Your Ex" (2017)

Music video
- "Slumber Party" on YouTube

"Slumber Party" is a song recorded by American singer Britney Spears for her ninth studio album, Glory (2016). It was written by Mattias Larsson, Robin Fredriksson, Julia Michaels and Justin Tranter, and produced by Mattman & Robin. The duo was also responsible for vocal production alongside Mischke Butler. The song was released as the second single from the album on November 17, 2016. A remix version featuring vocals from American singer Tinashe was sent to US contemporary hit radio on November 22. A reggae-pop and R&B track, "Slumber Party" features brass, marimba, syncopated synths, percussion and a horn section in its instrumentation. Lyrically, the song was described as an ode to fornicating and making sex tapes. In it, Spears evokes one-night stands, the ritual of sleepovers with friends and the teenage game seven minutes in heaven.

"Slumber Party" received positive reviews from music critics, who emphasized its sensual nature. Commercially, the song appeared on the national charts of countries such as Canada, Spain, Scotland and the United States, where it debuted and peaked at 86 on the US Billboard Hot 100, while topping the Dance Club Songs chart. A music video directed by Colin Tilley was shot in October 2016, and according to Spears, has an Eyes Wide Shut (1999) theme. The video was released on November 18, and features Spears and Tinashe during a sleepover-themed masquerade party in a mansion, where they are seen in rooms filled with bubbles, smoke and flashing lights. The video also features actor Sam Asghari, whom Spears would later go on to marry and divorce. "Slumber Party" was added to the set list of her residency show, Britney: Piece of Me (2013—2017), and was performed on two of her concert tours.

== Background and release ==
She interprets the story – whether she's talking about fun and sex or talking about heartbreak, you feel it. [She gives] voice for days. The voice is so specific but it never ends – there's endless possibilities.

— Tranter commenting on Spears

In September 2014, Spears posted a picture of herself in the studio, hinting that she was recording new music. A month later, during an interview, she revealed that she was working "very slowly, but progressively" on an album. In 2015, she continued to work on the record, and that November, Spears teased on her Instagram account that she was working with songwriters Justin Tranter and Julia Michaels, by posting a picture of them looking "bemused" with the caption: "Working hard and hardly working...new album...wheeeee!" A month later, Tranter gave an interview for website NewNowNext about his work with Spears, saying: "Working with Britney is a fucking dream. She is so sweet, so inspiring and a master on the mic. Me and Julia had to leave the studio one day because our screams of excitement after every take she did were distracting the producers." In May 2016, in an interview for website Breathe Heavy, he revealed: "Nobody ever talks about Britney as a writer and she's f**king great, like insane. Her concepts were bold and smart and very left of centre, in a good way. Melodically, she has melodies for days. How come no one mentions that this girl can write the f**k out of a song?. [...] "We got to work with her a bunch of times. A couple [of songs] we wrote on our own and then she wanted to write with us. She's an amazing writer."

"Slumber Party" was included as the eighth track on Glory, which released on August 26, 2016. After releasing "Make Me" as the lead single, Spears's team commissioned several polls to different magazines asking which song from the album should be the second single. On October 14, American singer Tinashe hinted on her Instagram account that she was recording vocals on a "legendary" collaboration with the caption: "Dreams are real." Later, on October 25, Spears posted a picture of herself with Tinashe on the set of the song's music video, with the caption: "Neighbors say we're causing a commotion...", a line from "Slumber Party". Billboard confirmed the news with Spears's representatives. Lewis Corner of Digital Spy also announced that the collaboration was going to be released "within a matter of weeks." Spears later commented on Tinashe, stating: "[She] is so sweet. I always see my fans talking about her online, and it just made so much sense to collaborate on this song. She was amazing, and would love to find another way to work together in the future!" The remix version was released on November 16, to digital download. It was sent to US contemporary hit radio on November 22.

During a 2022 interview on Watch What Happens Live with Andy Cohen, English singer Charli XCX revealed that she was asked to be featured on the remix of "Slumber Party", but she had to turn it down due to scheduling conflicts.

== Recording and composition ==
"Slumber Party" was written by Mattias Larsson, Robin Fredriksson, Julia Michaels and Justin Tranter, with production done by Mattman & Robin. Mattman & Robin were also responsible for vocal production, alongside Mischke Butler, as well as programming, drums, percussion, snaps, handclaps, synths, guitars, bass, marimba and brass. Michaels, on the other hand, provided background vocals. The song was recorded at 158 Studios in Westlake Village, California, and Wolf Cousins Studios in Stockholm, Sweden, as well as Conway Recording Studios in Los Angeles, California.

"Slumber Party" is really cool because it [...] has a Jamaican feel to it, it's really laid back. I think a lot of girls are gonna have a lot of sleepovers to this song, it's definitely a song you [listen to when] you and your girlfriends go out and just have a great time – eat a lot of pizza and talk about boys and be really naughty.

— Spears commenting on the song's composition.

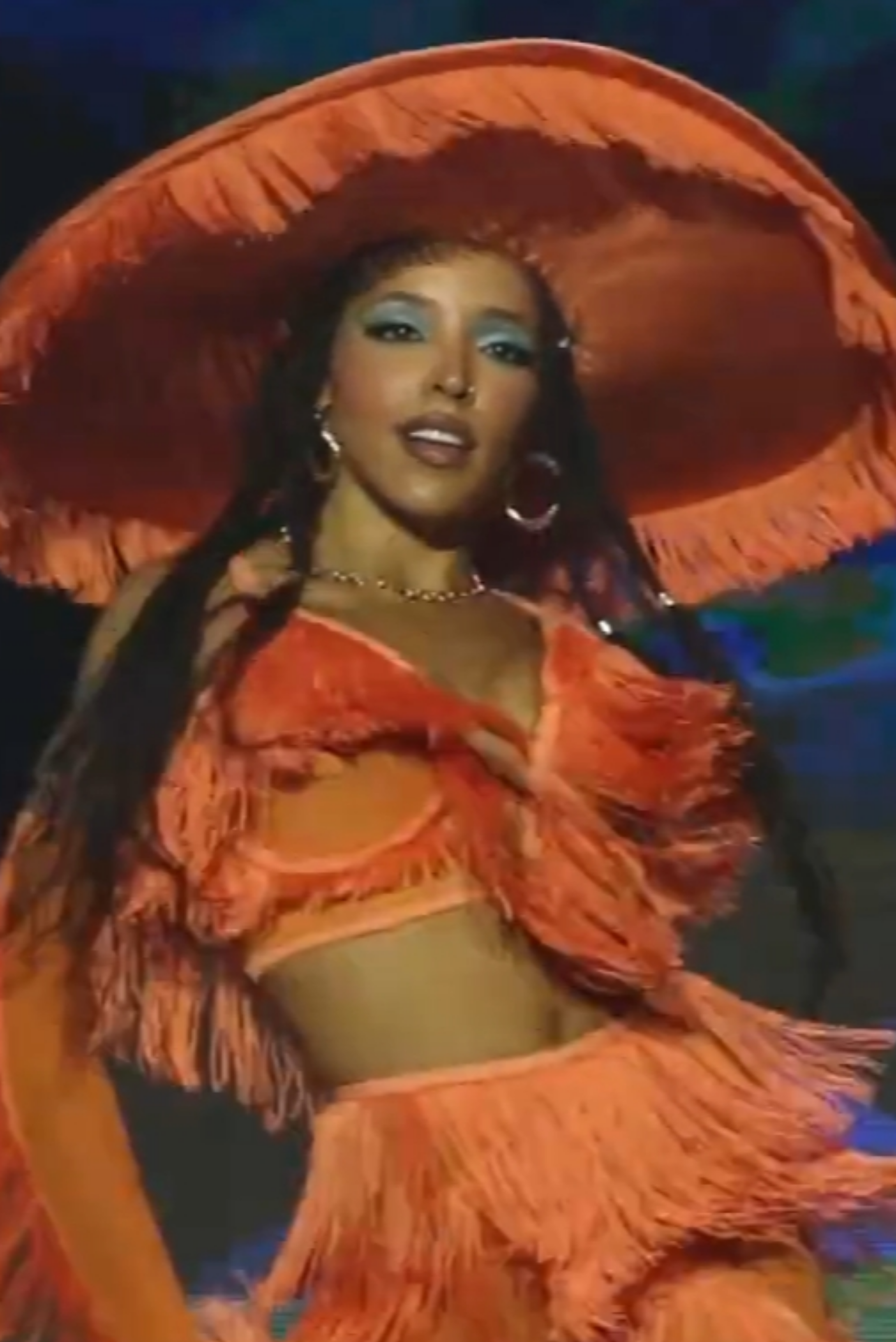
American pop singer Tinashe was featured on the official remix of "Slumber Party".

"Slumber Party" is a reggae-pop and R&B track, which lasts for three minutes and thirty-four seconds. It has "a sinuous groove accented by brass and marimba", syncopated synths, "cooing backing vocals" and percussion. Its final chorus features "a bombastic horn section." For Alex Macpherson of The Guardian, the song "is reminiscent of Spears's 2003 album, In the Zone", both in its "stylistic ground" and "low-key approach". Lewis Corner of Digital Spy compared its style to "Hotline Bling" (2015), for which Gay Times's Daniel Megarry and No Ripcord's Luiza Lodder echoed.

Lyrically, "Slumber Party" talks about sex. It was considered an "ode to fornication" and making sex tapes. Across the song, Spears uses a "euphemism for one-night stands" while invoking the "ritual of sleepovers with friends" and the teenage game seven minutes in heaven. In the pre-chorus, she promises, "We ain't gonna sleep tonight", while during the chorus, she sings, "We use our bodies to make our own videos/ Put on our music that makes us go fucking crazy, oh."

== Critical reception ==
Alim Kheraj of Digital Spy praised the "delightful" syncopated synths in the chorus and "the surprising addition of a bombastic horn section in the final chorus", while remarking: "Similarly, the final chorus contains the best Britney ad-libs this side of 2003. Now, all they need to do is get Drake on a remix on this and we've got a smash on our hands." Joe Pasmore of Attitude picked "Slumber Party" as a highlight, declaring that "while sharing Britney's nostalgic flare, [it] boast[s] modern production which brings the track firmly into 2016." Josh Duboff of Vanity Fair named it "a slinky, catchy jam", while Neil McCormick of The Daily Telegraph called it "effervescently catchy" and "a gem of slinky TLC." Writing for Drowned in Sound, Russell Warfield opined that the song "has a shot of being Britney's first bona fide hit since 'Womanizer' (2008)." Michael Arceneaux of Complex simply said that the song "serves its purpose quite well", calling it danceable.

Alex Macpherson of The Guardian noted that the song's "high-school metaphor would probably seem odder coming from a singer of that age; Spears sings it with self-awareness and a thorough commitment to the role-play scenario." And McCormick called its sexualization of "little girl sleepovers" dubious. Stephen Thomas Erlewine of AllMusic cited "Slumber Party" as a "heavy-breathing come-on that never manage[s] to seem sexy despite the flood of innuendo." While Kheraj called it "dreamy and genuinely sexy, something that Britney hasn't truly been since Blackout (2007). Describing it as a sultry "pop take on Drake's smash hit 'Hotline Bling'", Daniel Megarry of Gay Times remarked: "if this doesn't make your libido increase, nothing will." John Murphy of musicOMH commented on its sexual lyrics, declaring that the song "still manages to possess a slightly illicit thrill." Michael Smith of Renowned for Sound noted that the song "starts like Britney's sexier R&B songs, like 'Blur' (2008), but spins reggae into its chorus in a way that feels much on trend after Gwen Stefani's This Is What the Truth Feels Like (2016)".

== Chart performance ==
In the United States, "Slumber Party" debuted and peaked at number 86 on the Billboard Hot 100, with its music video generating a weekly total of 3.8 million streams. It also became Spears's 36th Hot 100 entry and Tinashe's fourth. On the Pop Songs chart, the song debuted at number 39; Spears's 34th entry on the chart and Tinashe's third, and peaking at number 27. It topped the Dance Club Songs chart, becoming the second single from Glory to do so, and Spears's overall 11th number one dance song on that chart. In the United Kingdom, the single entered at number 73 on the UK Singles Sales chart. In Hungary, it charted at number 13, becoming Glory's second top 20 single in the region. In Spain, the track debuted at number 39, becoming Spears's sixth consecutive top-forty entry and Tinashe's first entry. "Slumber Party" debuted at number 157 in France following the release of Glory, and climbed to number 121 a week later.

== Music video ==
=== Background and development ===
The music video for "Slumber Party" was directed by Colin Tilley and was shot in October 2016; on October 25, Spears posted to Instagram a photo of her with Tinashe on the music video's set. Tinashe later shared the same photo, with the caption: "The face you make when the rumors are true and you collabed with your idol & basically your whole life is a dream so you keep it cute for Brit but inside you are wigless and dead." Spears also posted a photo with her backup dancers and Tilley in the purplish-blue room. Lewis Corner of Digital Spy noted that "the visual looks set to be very seductive, with dimmed blue lights and provocative outfits." During an interview with Extra's Mario Lopez, the singer commented that the music video would be a younger version of Stanley Kubrick's film Eyes Wide Shut (1999), adding: "It's a little risky. It's very sexy. It's very moody. It's fun!" During an interview with MTV for Snapchat, Spears added: "The vibe was what you see in the video. Amazing costumes, energy, dancing, and people. We were filming a music video that portrays an incredible party, and that's what it felt like on set." The music video was released on November 18, and premiered on MTV's Snapchat Discover page shortly before being posted on Spears's official Vevo and YouTube pages. The video featured Iranian actor Sam Asghari, who would marry and divorce Spears years later.

=== Synopsis ===
The scene where Spears licks the milk spilled on the table was compared to Madonna's "Express Yourself" music video.

The video starts with Spears "roll[ing] up to a giant mansion wearing a tiny red dress. Upon entering, she's greeted by flame throwers and a slew of people ready to get their freak on", as stated by a writer from ET Online. Later, she is "spotted by the master of the house, a guy with what appears to be a David Bowie-esque lightning bolt on his face", as noted by the Billboard staff. The magazine staff continued, "Tinashe appears midway through the story dressed for the slumber party, and the pair get cuddly on a couch in negligee before instigating a sexy dance sequence." They also "navigate rooms overflowing with bubbles, smoke and flashing lights." During the video, Spears "changes into a series of sexy ensembles — including black lingerie, and other puffy blue princess skirts", as well as crawls across a table and "licks up spilled milk."

=== Reception ===
Cole Delbyk, writing for The Huffington Post, wrote that the video "saved 2016" and compared Spears's head-twirling and body-rolling to her 2001 "I'm a Slave 4 U" video. Billboard's staff called the video "pure indulgence", while Megan French of Us Weekly named it "too hot to handle." Emilee Lindner of Fuse was extremely positive, writing: "It's hot. It's heavy. It's a Britney Spears video. It even has her recreating her 'Toxic' (2004) moves as she crawls toward the camera on a table." Lewis Corner of Digital Spy considered it "easily one of the hottest of her career so far", adding that "the pair look absolutely flawless in the seductive visual." And Zac Johnson of E! News commented on her strut, "Not since 'Boys' (2002) has Britney made walking through party look like art". He also praised the chemistry between Spears and Tinashe, as well as the scene where the former is "crawling across the table and licking up spilled milk." Rolling Stone review highlighted that "director Colin Tilley peppers in salacious moments in the video wherever possible."

Cady Lang of Time wrote that the "unabashedly 'pop' feel of the video brings to mind the Brit that we all knew and loved back during her heyday — that is to say that there's no shortage of body glitter, choreographed group dance routines, candy colored ensembles, and toned abs during this grown-up 'Slumber Party'." The scene where Spears crawls on a table and licks spilled milk reminded Slant Magazine's Alexa Camp of a scene from Madonna's 1989 "Express Yourself" video. Less positively, Camp continued that the "Slumber Party" video did not explore the themes in Eyes Wide Shut, opting only to "[employ] sexuality—and homosexuality—purely for the benefit of the male gaze." While naming it "a fun, outrageous, and expensive-looking clip", Anna Gaca of Spin opined that "it's miles better than the forced, brand-filled video for 'Make Me,' and the addition of Tinashe's vocals is enough to make you wonder why they ever released the song without her."

== Live performances ==
Spears performed "Slumber Party" for the first time on her residency show, Britney: Piece of Me, on November 16, 2016. On December 2, Spears and Tinashe performed the song for the first time at the KIIS-FM Jingle Ball. A day later, they reprised the performance at 99.7's Triple Ho Show. "Slumber Party" was also performed on the 2017 Britney: Live in Concert Asian tour, as well as on the Piece of Me Tour in 2018, which covered North America and Europe.

== Track listing ==
- Remix EP
1. "Slumber Party" featuring Tinashe (Bad Royale Remix) – 3:12
2. "Slumber Party" featuring Tinashe (Marc Stout & Scott Svejda Remix) – 3:52
3. "Slumber Party" featuring Tinashe (Bimbo Jones Remix) – 3:54
4. "Slumber Party" featuring Tinashe (Danny Dove Remix) – 3:40
5. "Slumber Party" featuring Tinashe (Misha K Remix) – 3:35

== Credits and personnel ==
Credits adapted from the liner notes of Glory.

Recording

- Vocals recorded at 158 Studios, Westlake Village, California; Conway Recording Studios, Los Angeles, California; and at Wolf Cousins Studios, Stockholm, Sweden
- Mixed at MixStar Studios, Virginia Beach, Virginia

Personnel

- Britney Spears – lead vocals
- Tinashe – guest vocals on remix
- Mattman & Robin – songwriter, producer, vocal production, vocal recording, programming, drums, percussion, snaps, handclaps, synths, guitars, bass, marimba, brass
- Julia Michaels – songwriter, additional background vocals
- Justin Tranter – songwriter
- Mischke Butler – vocal production
- Benjamin Rice – vocal recording
- Erik Beltz – recording assistant
- John Cranfield – engineer
- Serban Ghenea – mixing
- John Hanes – mixing engineer

== Charts ==
=== Weekly charts ===
Chart (2016–17)	Peak position
Canada Hot 100 (Billboard)	51
CIS Airplay (TopHit)	92
France (SNEP)	121
Greece Digital Song Sales (Billboard)	10
Hungary (Single Top 40)	13
Russia Airplay (TopHit)	97
Scottish Singles Sales (Official Charts)	90
Spain (Promusicae)	39
UK Singles Sales (OCC)	73
UK Video Streaming (OCC)	100
Ukraine Airplay (TopHit)	11
US Billboard Hot 100	86
US Dance Club Songs (Billboard)	1
US Pop Airplay (Billboard)	27

=== Monthly charts ===
Chart (2017)	Peak position
Ukraine Airplay (TopHit)	41

=== Year-end charts ===
Chart (2017)	Position
Ukraine Airplay (TopHit)	192
US Dance Club Songs (Billboard)	17

== Release history ==
Region	Date	Format	Version	Label	Ref.
Italy	November 17, 2016	Contemporary hit radio	Remix	Sony Music	
United States	November 22, 2016	Contemporary hit radio	Remix	RCA	
Various	December 23, 2016	Digital download	Remix EP	RCA	
