= Mischke Butler =

American singer, songwriter, vocal producer, vocal arranger

Mischke J Butler
- Also known as: Mischke
- Born: Detroit, Michigan, United States
- Genres: R&B; pop; soul; hip-hop
- Occupations: Singer; songwriter; vocal producer; vocal arranger
- Label: mischkemusic inc. / Windswept Music / Universal Music Publishing Group

Mischke Butler is an American singer, songwriter, vocal producer, vocal coach and vocal arranger, best known for his work with Michael Jackson, The Spice Girls, Britney Spears, Keke Palmer, and Little Mix.

== Career ==
=== 1990s: Early career ===
Butler, raised in Detroit, appeared as a singer in 1994 television film Madonna: Innocence Lost, and released his debut single "Ready Fa Luv" in 1996, nominated for Best R&B/Soul video at the Canadian Much Music Video Awards. Butler was subsequently discovered by producer Rodney Jerkins, who would mentor him for several years. Originally a member of Jerkins' "camp" of lyric and melody writers, he soon began to branch out into vocal arrangements and production.

=== 2000s: Vocal production and Michael Jackson's Invincible ===
One of Butler's first opportunities as a composer was to participate in the writing process of the third Spice Girls album Forever. His mentor Jerkins was commissioned to executive-produce the album, and Butler would contribute to three songs, including one that was initially chosen to be the second single, "Tell Me Why". Butler's next opportunity within the Jerkins camp was to co-write and provide background vocals on "Heartbreaker", a song that made it onto Michael Jackson's tenth and final studio album Invincible. Butler would also contribute to seven songs on En Vogue vocalist Rhona Bennett's eponymous debut solo album, including lead single and dance chart hit "Satisfied", and co-write "Gots ta Be", the top-20 charting second single from boyband B2K's eponymous debut album. His next opportunities included placements on the Barbershop soundtrack, as well as co-writing "Who Will I Run To?", the second single from artist Kiley Dean's shelved album Simple Girl, and "I Like That", the #11-peaking debut single from R&B artist Houston. Butler would also co-write "Anything", the UK top 25-peaking third single from 2006 Jojo album The High Road, and R&B hit "In My Bedroom" for boyband B5's second album Don't Talk, Just Listen.

=== 2010s: Grammy nomination and Little Mix "Wings" ===
"Second Chance", the title track and one of two Butler contributions to 2010 El DeBarge's album Second Chance, earned him a Grammy nomination for Best R&B Song. Butler also contributed to songs on Jojo's mixtape Can't Take That Away From Me. He next co-wrote "Wings", the anthemic debut single of XFactor UK winners Little Mix, which would go number one in the UK and chart internationally.

In 2015, Butler was spotted in the studio with Britney Spears, who was working on what would become Glory, her ninth studio album. Butler was the principal vocal producer on the project eventually released in 2016, working on fourteen out of seventeen tracks of the deluxe edition.

== Selected songwriting, production, background vocal and arrangement credits ==
Credits are courtesy of Discogs, Spotify, and AllMusic.

Title	Year	Artist	Album
"Tell Me Why"	2000	Spice Girls	Forever
"Get Down with Me"	2000	Spice Girls	Forever
"Time Goes By"	2000	Spice Girls	Forever
"Get with Me"	2000	Shorty 101	Nutty Professor II: The Klumps (soundtrack)
"Dame (Touch Me)" (With Jennifer Lopez)	2000	Chayanne	Simplemente & J.Lo
"Heartbreaker" (Featuring Fats)	2001	Michael Jackson	Invincible
"Satisfied"	2001	Rhona Bennett	Rhona
"Take What Comes To You"	2001	Rhona Bennett	Rhona
"The First Time"	2001	Rhona Bennett	Rhona
"Last Goodbye"	2001	Rhona Bennett	Rhona
"Time Will Tell"	2001	Rhona Bennett	Rhona
"I Will"	2001	Rhona Bennett	Rhona
"Look To The Sky"	2001	Rhona Bennett	Rhona
"Imagination"	2001	Jessica Simpson	Irresistible
"I Never"	2001	Jessica Simpson	Irresistible
"What Your Name Is"	2002	Mario	Mario
"Holla Back"	2002	Mario	Mario
"Could U Be"	2002	Mario	Mario
"Shady Holiday"	2002	3LW	Naughty or Nice
"Gots ta Be"	2002	B2K	B2K
"What's Come Over Me?"	2002	Glenn Lewis & Amel Larrieux	Barbershop (soundtrack)
"Don't Wanna Say Goodbye"	2003	Blu Cantrell	Bittersweet
"All About Nothing"	2003	Christina Vidal	Chasing Papi: Music From The Motion Picture
"Let Your Hair Down"	2003	Dwele	Subject
"Happy" (Featuring B2K)	2003	Jhené Aiko	You Got Served (soundtrack)
"Down 4 U P.2" (Featuring Lil' Fizz)	2003	Jhené Aiko	You Got Served (soundtrack) & My Name Is Jhene (Shelved)
"Who Will I Run To?"	2003	Kiley Dean	Simple Girl
"I Like That"	2004	Houston	It's Already Written & Robots (2005 soundtrack)
"Jus Anotha Shorty"	2004	O'Ryan	O'Ryan
"In A Bad Way"	2004	O'Ryan	O'Ryan
"Bad Situation"	2004	O'Ryan	O'Ryan
"Going Out Your Way"	2004	O'Ryan	O'Ryan
"45 Minutes"	2004	O'Ryan	O'Ryan
"She Loves The Club"	2004	O'Ryan	O'Ryan
"Shorty"	2004	O'Ryan	O'Ryan
"Gone"	2005	Frankie J	The One
"Ooo"	2005	Trey Songz	I Gotta Make It
"Wassup"	2006	Javier Colon	Left of Center
"Anything"	2006	JoJo	The High Road
"Keep It Movin" (Featuring Big Meech)	2007	Keke Palmer	So Uncool
"First Crush"	2007	Keke Palmer	So Uncool
"In My Bedroom"	2007	B5	Don't Talk, Just Listen
"Already Gone"	2008	Girlicious	Girlicious
"Inside Out"	2008	Prima J	Prima J
"Space"	2008	Melody Thornton	Doll Domination
"Don't Wanna Fall in Love"	2008	Kimberly Wyatt	Doll Domination
"Played"	2008	Ashley Roberts	Doll Domination
"Let It Go"	2008	Brit & Alex	Step Up 2: The Streets (soundtrack)
"Outta Here"	2009	Esmée Denters	Outta Here
"Bigger than the World"	2009	Esmée Denters	Outta Here
"When I See You"	2010	El DeBarge	Second Chance
"Second Chance"	2010	El DeBarge	Second Chance
"Can't Take That Away from Me"	2010	JoJo	Can't Take That Away from Me
"Running on Empty"	2010	JoJo	Can't Take That Away from Me
"Top of the World"	2011	Keke Palmer	Awaken
"New Boyfriend"	2011	Keke Palmer	Awaken
"Keke's Love"	2011	Keke Palmer	Awaken
"Get Out My Head"	2011	Keke Palmer	Awaken
"Addicted"	2011	Nick Carter	I'm Taking Off
"Falling Down"	2011	Nick Carter	I'm Taking Off
"I'm Taking Off"	2011	Nick Carter	I'm Taking Off
"Make You Mine"	2011	Talay Riley	Going To California (Shelved)
"Wings"	2012	Little Mix	DNA
"Stain on My Heart"	2012	Stefanie Heinzmann	Stefanie Heinzmann
"Second Time Around"	2012	Stefanie Heinzmann	Stefanie Heinzmann
"Ain't No Way"	2012	Stefanie Heinzmann	Stefanie Heinzmann
"Make Me" (Featuring G-Eazy)	2016	Britney Spears	Glory
"Private Show"	2016	Britney Spears	Glory
"Clumsy"	2016	Britney Spears	Glory
"Slumber Party"	2016	Britney Spears	Glory
"Company"	2016	Tinashe	Nightride
"Heartless"	2016	Keke Palmer	Waited To Exhale
"Getting to Me"	2022	Orianthi	Rock Candy
"The Beautiful Unknown"	2022	Matt Goss	The Beautiful Unknown

== Album Vocal production and arrangement credits ==
Album	Year	Artist
Fight the Feeling	2002	Luis Fonsi
Mario	2002	Mario
It's Already Written	2004	Houston
O'Ryan	2004	O'Ryan
2U	2006	Keshia Chanté
Second Chance	2010	El DeBarge
Glory	2016	Britney Spears

== Filmography ==
Year	Title	Role	Notes	Ref.
1994	Madonna: Innocence Lost	Doo-wop Singer	TV Movie	
2015	Jem and the Holograms		Vocal Coach	

== Awards and nominations ==
Year	Award Ceremony	Award	Result	Ref
1996	1996 MuchMusic Video Awards	Best Soul/R&B Video (Ready Fa Luv)	Nominated	
2010	2010 Soul Train Music Awards	The Ashford & Simpson Songwriter's Award (Second Chance)	Nominated	
2011	53rd Annual Grammy Awards	Grammy Award for Best R&B Song (Second Chance)	Nominated	
