= Private Show (Britney Spears song) =

2016 promotional single by Britney Spears

Promotional single by Britney Spears

from the album Glory
- Released: August 4, 2016
- Studio: Kasai Studios (North Hollywood, CA); Studio at the Palms (Las Vegas, NV)
- Genre: R&B; doo-wop
- Length: 3:54
- Label: RCA
- Songwriters: Britney Spears; Carla Marie Williams; Tramaine Winfrey; Simon Smith
- Producers: Tramaine "Young Fyre" Winfrey; Mischke Butler (vocal)

Audio video
- "Private Show" on YouTube

"Private Show" is a song recorded by American singer Britney Spears for her ninth studio album, Glory (2016). It was written by Spears, Carla Marie Williams, Tramaine Winfrey and Simon Smith, with production being done by Tramaine "Young Fyre" Winfrey and vocal production by Mischke Butler. The song was first teased with the fragrance of the same name, and later was released as a promotional single from the album on August 4, 2016.

"Private Show" is an R&B and doo-wop song, having "staccato-like rhythm", "snaps, claps and other percussive flares" in its instrumentation. Spears' vocals on the track were considered soulful. Lyrically, "Private Show" finds Spears using theatrical metaphors as she promises a private show for her lover. The song was also used during the advertising campaign video, directed by Randee St Nichols and released on July 13, 2016.

"Private Show" divided music critics, some of whom praised the doo-wop influence, while others criticized Spears' vocals.

== Background and release ==
After the commercial lackluster of her eight studio album, Britney Jean (2013), Spears started her Las Vegas residency show, Britney: Piece of Me, which attained commercial success. Later, in September 2014, Spears posted a picture of herself in the studio, hinting that she was recording new music. In another interview, a month later, she revealed that she was working "very slowly, but progressively" on the album. In 2015, she released the song "Pretty Girls" with Iggy Azalea, however the song was met with moderate impact and Spears headed back to the studio to record more songs, but didn't have plans to release a new album. In late 2016, during interviews to promote the album, Spears declared that she wanted to explore new things on the record, and that it was her "most hip-hop album," explaining: "[...] there are like two or three songs that go in the direction of more urban that I've wanted to do for a long time now, and I just haven't really done that."

In March 2016, British songwriter Carla Marie Williams confirmed she was working with Spears on the record. On June 17, 2016, Spears announced that her new fragrance, entitled Private Show, would be available soon. A week later, the singer revealed that the title for the fragrance was inspired by a song on her then-upcoming album. She explained to E! News' Marc Malkin, stating: "I had a really, really cool song that I worked with on my album and the girl was amazing. She's from London. She came in and she's like a wailer. She has really big vocal chops. I was like, 'Let's do something different' and do a really, really cool song for the fragrance. It just made sense, and it was called 'Private Show.' It clicked." On July 11, 2016, Spears teased a commercial of the fragrance with snippets of the track. On July 13, 2016, the full commercial was released, featuring more snippets of the track. On August 4, 2016, the song was fully released as a promotional single along with the pre-order for the album. The same day, it was also released for streaming.

== Composition ==
"Private Show" was written by Spears, Carla Marie Williams, Tramaine Winfrey and Simon Smith. It was produced by Tramaine "Young Fyre" Winfrey, with Mischke Butler serving as a vocal producer and Williams providing background vocals. It was recorded at Kasai Studios, North Hollywood, and at The Studio at the Palms, Las Vegas. According to the sheet music published at Musicnotes.com by Universal Music Publishing Group, the song is written in the key of D major, with a quick tempo of 225 beats per minute. Spears' vocal range spans over two and a half octaves from E_{3} to C_{6} "Private Show" is an R&B and doo-wop song, with "staccato-like rhythm", "snaps, claps and other percussive flares" in its instrumentation. During the song, Spears gives a soulful vocal performance, delivering her "signature baby voice" during the chorus and "raw-tinged vocals" during the bridge. In a track-by-track commentary, Spears stated about the track: "It's a really fun song, it's more urban, it's laid back and I think it shows my vocal chops a little bit more than my songs." She further added: "'Private Show' is inevitably a sexy song and it promotes feeling sexy and girls feeling alive and I think that's fun for girls."

Lyrically, "Private Show" finds Spears promising a private show for her lover, teasing to "twerk it" and "spin it". The song features verses with theatrical metaphors, such as: "All my tricks, they're spectacular/ My encore is immaculate." During the chorus, she sings: "Put on a private show, pull the curtains until they close, I put on a private show, we’ll be whiling all on the low." Amy Roberts of Bustle added that the song is "a personal celebration of female sexuality. [...] Spears is also clearly celebrating that joyful feeling of truly owning your sexuality, of being unapologetic of it, and of expressing it in a tactile, fun way." [...] "All in all, though, 'Private Show' seems to be a song about having fun in the bedroom. About being proud of your body, your sexuality, and your talents, and using them to not just pleasure a lover, but to also enjoy yourself in the process." Rob Sheffield of Rolling Stone added that "when she thinks she and her lover might be stealing a moment to themselves, sharing a moment of unmediated emotion, she notices there's a crowd watching. So she shrugs it off: 'Guess that's the end. Can we go again—do it all again? Nah, I'll take a bow.'"

== Critical reception ==
"Private Show" received mixed reviews from music critics. Anna Gaca of Spin was favorable with the track, calling it "a bubbly, pole dance-inspired number" with a "clipped [...] chorus that sounds tailor-made for a Vegas show." Stephen Thomas Erlewine of AllMusic declared that "some of the highlights [on the album] are the silliest songs," adding "Private Show" and "Slumber Party" as examples, defining them as "a pair of heavy-breathing come-ons that never manage to seem sexy despite the flood of innuendo." Nolan Feeney of Entertainment Weekly shared a similar view, writing that "even weaker tracks, such as the grating strip-tease 'Private Show,' feel like glimpses of the real Britney—her musical tastes, her voice—imperfections and all." For Rob Sheffield of Rolling Stone, "the conceptual centerpiece [of the record] is the deceptively giddy 'Private Show,' which isn't quite the stripper-in-a-stupor lapdance goof it pretends to be." Andy Gill of The Independent praised the varied usage of her voice on the track, "where the excess sass suggests an attempt to occupy Katy Perry territory."

Alex Macpherson of The Guardian commented positively about her vocals, writing that "the zany 'Private Show' is a showcase for Spears to explore first helium-textured cartoon coquettishness, which seems a touch inspired by young Cyndi Lauper, and then an oddly snappy chirrup about working the pole. It's refreshing to hear Spears having fun on record – Private Show contains more goofy character than Spears's past three albums combined – as well as making a song in which her slinkiness is played for laughs rather than sexiness." Maeve McDermott of USA Today picked it as one of the essential tracks on the album, calling it "one of Glory's most explicitly sexy tracks that, to Spears’ credit, could’ve gone terribly wrong." He also praised the producer Young Fyre for "keep[ing] the song from veering into parody by going retro with a doo-wop swing that would make Meghan Trainor jealous. Plus, it's a reminder that Spears, when she's not reaching the rafters with her breathy cooing, has a growling lower register that doesn't get used enough."

Michael Cragg of The Observer, Nick Levine of NME and Sal Cinquemani of Slant Magazine considered the song a "misstep", with Cragg referring to it as "horrendous," Levine opining that "Spears doesn't have the lung power to pull off vampish R&B tracks like 'Private Show'," and Cinquemani saying that the song is "as sexy as getting a lap dance from someone with the flu, as Britney's trademark adenoidal whine sounds more like a sinus infection." Maura Johnston of Boston Globe said the song was a "campy track [...] fronted by a winking, bravado-filled performance."

"Private Show" landed at number nine on Time magazine's list of the worst songs of 2016, writing that "the superstar’s girly-girl voice gets distorted in overproduction, while uncomfortable allusions to working a stripper pole feel more forced than enticing." Writing for Glamour, Christopher Rosa named the song Spears's worst of all-time: "'Private Show,' unfortunately, is an unlistenable song—and I say that with the upmost love and respect for Britney Jean Spears. This one should've been left on the cutting room floor." Sheffield wrote that its commercial failure added to its meaning's intimacy: "The fact that the single really was a private show — i.e., nobody bought it, played it on the radio, or even noticed it came out — just adds to the mise en scene."

== Promotional video ==
The promotional commercial video for the fragrance was directed by Randee St. Nichols and was teased on July 11, 2016. The full advertising campaign was released exclusively by Entertainment Tonight on July 13, 2016. It features Spears "seductively throwing a power switch," while "wearing a lacy overcoat" and later she reveals "a skimpy black monokini"– complete with fishnet stockings and black stilettos – and "dance[s] seductively in an empty theater" to the sound of the song. Near the end of the commercial, Spears wears a "shimmering silver bodysuit," which was compared to a scene during the "Toxic" music video (2004), where she is seen naked with nothing but diamonds glued to her body.

== Credits and personnel ==
Credits adapted from the liner notes of Glory.

Recording

- Vocals recorded at Kasai Studios, North Hollywood, California; The Studio at the Palms, Las Vegas, Nevada
- Mixed at Larrabee Studios, North Hollywood, California

Personnel

- Britney Spears – songwriter, lead vocals, background vocals
- Carla Marie Williams – songwriter, additional background vocals
- Tramaine "Young Fyre" Winfrey – songwriter, producer
- Mischke – vocal producer
- Simon Smith – songwriter
- Benjamin Rice – vocal recording
- Jaycen Joshua – mixing
- Kevin Luu – recording assistant
- Maddox Chhim – mixing assistant
- Dave Nakaji – mixing assistant

== Charts ==
"Private Show" appeared for two weeks on France's SNEP singles chart. It debuted at number one hundred forty-one on the week of August 6, 2016, and later dropped to number one hundred sixty-seven on August 13, 2016.

Chart (2016)	Peak position
France (SNEP)	141
Scottish Singles Sales (Official Charts)	92
US Pop Digital Songs (Billboard)	31
