= Pretty Girls (Britney Spears and Iggy Azalea song) =

2015 single by Britney Spears and Iggy Azalea

Single by Britney Spears and Iggy Azalea
- Released: May 4, 2015
- Recorded: 2014
- Studio: Grove Studios and Ravenscort Studios (London); House of Blues (Encino, California)
- Genre: Electro-hop
- Length: 2:43
- Label: RCA
- Composers: George Astasio; Jason Pebworth; Jon Shave; Maegan Cottone
- Lyricists: Iggy Azalea; Perrie Edwards; Jesy Nelson; Leigh-Anne Pinnock; Jade Thirlwall
- Producer: The Invisible Men

Britney Spears singles chronology
"Perfume" (2013)	"Pretty Girls" (2015)	"Tom's Diner" (2015)

Iggy Azalea singles chronology
"Trouble" (2015)	"Pretty Girls" (2015)	"Team" (2016)

Music video
- "Pretty Girls" on YouTube

"Pretty Girls" is a song recorded by American singer Britney Spears and Australian rapper Iggy Azalea. Azalea co-wrote the song with Maegan Cottone, British girl group Little Mix, and the song's producers, The Invisible Men. The single was released on May 4, 2015, by RCA Records.

The music video for "Pretty Girls" premiered on May 13, 2015, and was directed by Azalea and Cameron Duddy. The visuals were inspired by the 1988 film Earth Girls Are Easy, starring Geena Davis. The song was performed live by Spears and Azalea for the first time on May 17 at the 2015 Billboard Music Awards. Later that year, it was added to the setlist for Spears' Las Vegas residency show, Britney: Piece of Me.

The collaboration peaked within the top 20 in the United Kingdom, Canada, Hungary, Scotland, and South Korea as well as the top 30 in the United States, France, and Australia. The track also received two nominations at the 2015 Teen Choice Awards.

== Background and release ==
On September 9, 2014, during an interview with Extra at The Intimate Britney Spears Collection launch in New York City, Spears revealed she had slowly but steadily started working on a new album. When asked who she would like to collaborate with, Spears said she would like to do something with Katy Perry or Iggy Azalea. Rumors began to circulate that a collaboration between the two artists was already in the works, with Azalea saying she had done a "secret collaboration" with someone she had been interested in.

In December 2014, Azalea told Kiss 108 backstage at their Jingle Ball Tour 2014 that their collaborative song would premiere in 2015, "We have a song, which is going to be her first single, coming out next year." Asked how the collaboration came about, Azalea added, "She said she would like to work with me in an interview and they reached out. We recorded a few different things and then one of those just ended up being, I think, undeniably great. Hopefully I think everybody will get to hear it at the beginning of next year." In February 2015, Azalea tweeted there were "epic" ongoing plans for the song. For Spears's Billboard magazine cover story, published online on March 12, 2015, it was reported that despite Spears being back in the recording studio as back as in September 2014 working on a duet with Azalea, among other tracks, a proper full-length album would not be coming soon. Spears further explained, "I'm gonna do [a new album] slowly but surely [...] I'm gonna try to do my best to do an amazing album, but it's not my full priority right now". Azalea confirmed the title of the track the following week. Afterwards, in Spears's cover story with People magazine, it was announced that "Pretty Girls" would be released on May 5.

On March 29, 2015, on the red carpet of the 2nd iHeartRadio Music Awards in Los Angeles, Azalea confirmed "Pretty Girls" would be featured on Spears' upcoming album during an interview with MTV News and explained the song's evolution mentioning its final version being a real duet with her also joining Spears on the chorus instead of an actual featured rapping. When describing the song in an interview with USA Today, Azalea said, "It's just a lot of fun. It's a classic, girly (song) you want to scream to each other when you're getting ready". Although the collaboration was finished in fall 2014, Azalea did not meet Spears in person until January 2015, when she invited Spears to her house for lunch.

On April 30, 2015, the single artwork, an illustration of the artists in an outer space background referring to the '80s film Earth Girls Are Easy, was unveiled online. Portions of the song began surfacing on the internet later that day, and the song leaked in its entirety on May 2, 2015, two days prior to its official release. On May 3, 2015, Spears announced she had teamed up with Uber to give fans an early listen of the song. For six hours between 3pm-9pm PDT on that day, requesters in Los Angeles were able to ride select Britney-themed vehicles called "Bees" while listening to the song and have a chance to win surprise gifts and tickets to her show, Britney: Piece of Me in Las Vegas. On May 4, 2015, "Pretty Girls" was released for digital download, with anticipating fans trending the hashtag #PrettyGirls on Twitter.

== Critical reception ==
"Pretty Girls" received mixed to positive reviews from contemporary music critics and fans. Jason Lipshutz of Billboard gave the track a positive review, saying "pop and pop-rap fans are likely to swarm this slick slice of electro-hop, which pulls off the blonde-bombshell pairing by playing to each of its artists' strengths," adding that Spears "sounds more animated in her two minutes of action here than on the entirety of 2013's Britney Jean album," and praising The Invisible Men's production claiming it differs just enough from Azalea's previous singles having "bestowed her with another stylish banger." Jim Farber of the New York Daily News claimed the track "is a breezy, summer song that will get stuck in your head" but lacking "the snap, and the freshness" of "Fancy". Jesse Spero of Yahoo! Music called it "the song of the summer." Hardeep Phull of the New York Post criticized the song's similar production to "Fancy" and described it as "a woefully formulaic rehash." August Brown of the Los Angeles Times mentioned the "bubbly electro-trap beats, a lot of teen-sassy rapping and the two sharing lead singing vocals on the chorus," also commenting "your summer song sweepstakes bracket just got an early contender."

Lucas Villa of AXS remarked the "anthemic chorus about girl power in the party scene" and the "plucky production kicks" with a sound marrying '80s dance music like Debbie Deb's "Lookout Weekend" and recent hits "Fancy" and "Hollaback Girl," also complimenting Spears for finally giving fans "something more urban in the same vein of 2007's Blackout" and that both artists "make good on their promise to "bring the noise" on this attitude-packed club banger." Hugh McIntyre of Forbes referenced a polarizing reception of the track that was "already being heralded by some as a fantastic new direction for the singer, while others aren’t so sure." Abby Schreiber of Paper also observed the similar sound to "Fancy" interjecting with "No matter. The dance-pop, girl power jam has a catchy beat and some pretty great track art," while Ian David Monroe of V expressed the same thoughts, "And you won't hear any complaints from us. It’s been almost two long years since the world had a new Britney track, so we’ll take it." Sydney Gore of Nylon also heralded it as a "Fancy"-follow up as well as an "empowering song in some regard." Bradley Stern of PopCrush also gave the song a positive review, commenting "those trap-lite hi-hats and twinkly club beats are pure Hip-Hopney heaven" and "it’ll be a surefire contender for song of the Summer 2015". Time named "Pretty Girls" the third-worst song of 2015. Entertainment Weekly's Andrew Hampp named it the worst female collaboration of the time span 1988–2018.

== Commercial performance ==
"Pretty Girls" reached the top 20 in the United Kingdom, Canada, and Finland and the top 40 in the United States, France and Australia. In North America, the song debuted and peaked at number 29 in the United States on the Billboard Hot 100 with digital sales of 96,000, marking Spears' 22nd solo top 40 (24th top 40 overally) and 33rd career entry on the chart. It dropped out of the top 40 of the Hot 100 three weeks after its release and spent eight weeks on the chart. For the issue dated July 18, 2015, the single peaked at the apex of the Billboard Hot Dance Club Songs Chart, becoming her ninth No. 1 and her first since 2011's "I Wanna Go". The single peaked at number 16 on the Canadian Hot 100 chart.

In Europe, "Pretty Girls"'s strongest entry was seen in the United Kingdom, where it debuted at number 16 on the Official Singles Chart, becoming Spears' 30th top 20 entry in the country, but fell out of the chart only three weeks after entry. The track also debuted at number 64 on the Irish Singles Chart for May 7, 2015 although debuting at number 19 on the downloads chart, subsequently peaking at number 60 on the former.

In Oceania, "Pretty Girls" debuted at number 40 on the Australian Singles Chart issued for May 11, 2015, becoming Spears' 31st top 50 and 32nd top 100 entry, and later peaked at number 27. In a Twitter Q&A with fans in the following month, Azalea expressed her desire to have done additional promotion and television performances to support the song commercially.

== Music video ==
=== Background ===
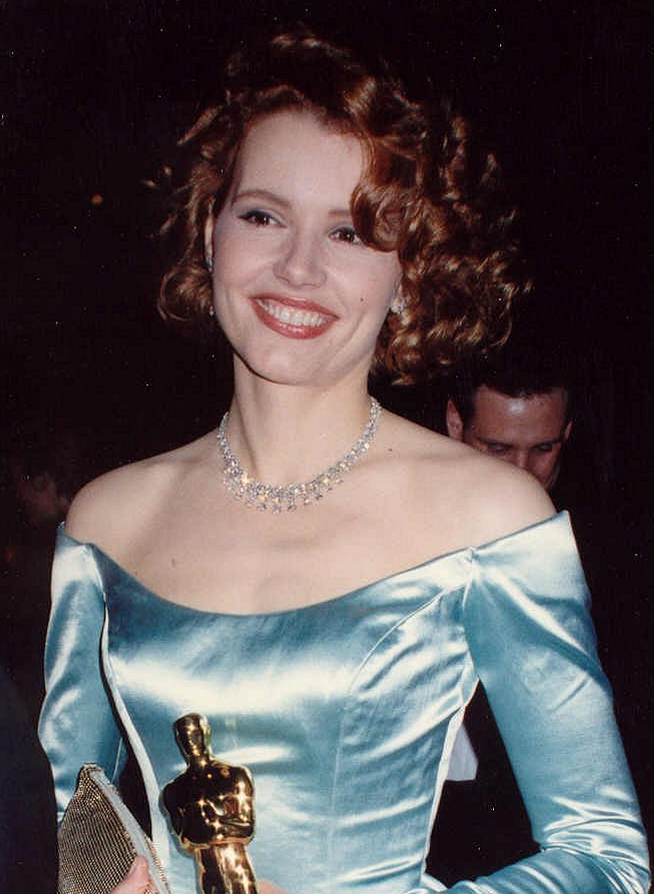
Azalea said she looked to actress Geena Davis (pictured) when modeling her style for the music video.

While being interviewed on March 29, 2015, at the 2nd iHeartRadio Music Awards, Azalea revealed she would be co-directing the music video for "Pretty Girls" along with Cameron Duddy, adding that Spears has contributed in the creative process as well. "I love her [Azalea's] work and I had an idea to do like a really girl power, fun Valley girl video," Spears claimed of the video partnership, adding that it was the first video she had done in a long time where she came up with the concept, also stating "there’s a lot of dancing. I got new choreographers to come in and kind of do hip-hop dancing, which I haven’t done in a really long time, so the feel of the video is really different and hi-energy."

On April 9, 2015, Spears and Azalea were shown filming scenes for the music video around the streets of Studio City, Los Angeles, after Spears shared lyrics of the track and a behind-the-scenes snapshot on her Twitter account. Spears shared a picture from the video shoot captioning it with lyrics of the song on her social media accounts. In the '80s-inspired visuals seen on the candid images, Spears wore a sexy leopard print top, ripped blue jeans, and pumps with matching sunglasses, triangle-shaped earrings, and pink lipstick, while Azalea was wearing matching denim jacket and shorts with crimped hair, while posing together in a bright red convertible Fox-Body Mustang and with Spears also driving around in a yellow Jeep CJ. Azalea then shared a selfie from the set on her Instagram account along with a hashtag of the song title. They were pictured again on the second day of production of the video shoot on April 10, 2015, with Spears wearing a same outfit from the day before but with a shorter hairstyle donning a voluminous curly bob, and Azalea changing into a sleeveless tie-dye ensemble. Spears choreographed a car wash scene with male backup dancers finishing a dance routine.

During an interview with USA Today, Azalea talked about the concept of the music video, mentioning Spears' signature dance scenes, "I think Britney's identity is really embedded in being a dancer, and that's something she really wanted to do as well. So, there's a lot of dancing in the video, but I wouldn’t say it's necessarily centered around that." When asked about the '80s-inspired visuals seen on the candids from the video shoot, she explained that it would have a narrative and stated that Britney wanted to do a video where she got to dress up and play a character. Azalea revealed she looked to actress Geena Davis when modeling her style, describing her as "the ultimate '80s pin-up hot, cool type of girl" that Britney also liked. Spears added, "I had called my manager and had some ideas about doing a Valley girl-type video. It was really kind of funny, because I had just watched Clueless on TV, and was like, 'It would be so fun to do something like that.' Then I saw Iggy's video, and I thought, 'Oh my God, to work with her would be heaven sent.'" They brainstormed the concept for the video, deciding on a send-up of 1988 sci-fi comedy Earth Girls Are Easy, which starred Davis. Spears said, "I do a makeover for her and we go to a club. The best part about it was just us coming together with the clothes and doing the '80s haircuts. We were all about being characters, so it was kind of funny for us. We weren't taking ourselves so seriously".

=== Release and synopsis ===
The music video was directed by Azalea and Cameron Duddy and was released on May 13. It continues a cult movie related focus for Azalea's music videos, her last year's single "Fancy" paid homage to the '90s teen film Clueless and "Black Widow" to the Kill Bill films. The clip is a homage to the 1988 film, Earth Girls Are Easy, directed by Julien Temple and starring Geena Davis. It therefore is heavily based on '80s fashion and technology as well as the loose plot of the film. The video begins with Spears reclining poolside filing her nails with the health and wellness supplement MateFit. visible. Suddenly, an alien Iggy Azalea crashes into the pool. Spears then proceeds to give Azalea a new makeover.

Two women dress up in '80s fashion and drive in a bright yellow jeep to a car wash, where Spears and backup dancers break into dance. Meanwhile, Azalea's alien powers cause a television to explode, water to turn pink and an ATM to begin shooting cash, which Spears dances around. Soon, two women hop into a convertible with Spears' friends, where Azalea turns Spears' retro handheld telephone into a Samsung Galaxy S6. Nightfall arrives and two women head to a club where Azalea raps and Spears and dancers choreograph a synchronized dance break. Suddenly, the nightclub begins to shake and an unseen force proceeds to abduct Azalea and Spears, to the latter's delight. The screen fades black before two women appear laughing and doing arm movements in the yellow jeep and the credits roll.

=== Reception ===
Josh Duboff from Vanity Fair described the video as "entertaining and kind of weird. There’s a lot of big hair; Spears does some endearing waving (and generally seems to be having a good time)". He concluded, "Our favorite part is actually probably the tag at the end, where Spears and Azalea are just goofing around in the car; you can imagine Spears turning to Azalea afterwards and squealing, "That was really cool, I had so much fun," and meaning it". Kirthana Ramisetti for New York Daily News similarly noted, "The two music stars seemed to have a lot of fun filming their video".

Francesca Bacardi commented for E! Online News, "all of the neons, '80s hair and dance moves you could ever ask. In addition to Spears looking phenomenal". While noting product placement, Bacardi added "but who cares because it's Britney". Jason Lipshutz for Billboard noted "Spears nods to her classic music video choreography with a few synchronized moves", adding "there's a lot of Britney Spears dancing in this video, which should absolutely thrill her diehard fans". Nolan Feeney for Time remarked, "Iggy crash-lands in her pool (in a clear nod to the 'My Prerogative' video)" before concluding "she [Spears] hasn’t looked this happy to be dancing in a video in some time". Writing for Entertainment Weekly, Christopher Rosen opined "Spears and Azalea don their best Valley girl clothes for the video, which also includes a short comedy interlude about Azalea’s 'radical alien powers.' It's not as funny as that part in the 'Oops!… I Did It Again' video when Spears gets the necklace the old lady dropped in the ocean at the end of Titanic, but it'll do". The music video for "Pretty Girls" was also viewed over 100 million times on Vevo, achieving "Vevo Certified" status on July 24, 2015, becoming the fastest video by Spears to reach 100 million views on her channel. It won the fan-voted competition of music videos of 2015 by Fuse.

== Live performances ==
On April 22, 2015, Billboard and Dick Clark Productions confirmed Spears and Azalea would be performing "Pretty Girls" for the first time on television at the 2015 Billboard Music Awards from the MGM Grand Garden Arena in Las Vegas on May 17. Azalea described the performance as a kind of a continuation from the music video, with both Spears and Azalea going to Azalea character's planet, along with other creatures. The performance received mostly positive reviews from viewers and critics. People said that Spears and Azalea proved they are more than just "pretty girls". Stating "From the moment they touched down on stage, the duo kept the crowd cheering with a fun, colorful performance." Entertainment Weekly also said that "Spears gave one of her most energetic televised performances in years." On May 13, Spears confirmed that she would be adding the song to her Las Vegas residency show Britney: Piece of Me. The song was officially integrated into the set list on August 5, 2015. It was later replaced by "Make Me..." and "Do You Wanna Come Over?" on August 17, 2016, following the show's revamp.

== Awards and nominations ==
Year	Award	Work	Results
2015	Billboard Mid-Year Music Awards	Most Buzzed-About Moment	Nominated
2015	Teen Choice Awards	Choice Song: Female	Nominated
2015	Teen Choice Awards	Choice Music: Collaboration	Nominated
2015	Vevo Certified Awards	Videos with over 100 Million Views on Vevo	Won

== Track listings ==
- CD single
1. "Pretty Girls" – 2:43
2. "Pretty Girls" (Instrumental) – 2:40
- Digital download
1. "Pretty Girls" – 2:44

== Charts ==
=== Weekly charts ===
Chart (2015)	Peak position
Australia (ARIA)	27
Austria (Ö3 Austria Top 40)	74
Belgium (Ultratip Bubbling Under Flanders)	1
Belgium (Ultratop 50 Wallonia)	42
Belgium Urban (Ultratop Flanders)	15
Canada Hot 100 (Billboard)	16
Canada CHR/Top 40 (Billboard)	27
Canada Hot AC (Billboard)	41
CIS Airplay (TopHit)	190
Czech Republic Singles Digital (ČNS IFPI)	72
Finland Airplay (Radiosoittolista)	60
Finland Download (Latauslista)	16
France (SNEP)	25
Germany (Official German Charts)	88
Greece Digital Songs (Billboard)	6
Hungary (Single Top 40)	11
Ireland (IRMA)	60
Italy (FIMI)	75
Scottish Singles Sales (Official Charts)	10
Slovakia Singles Digital (ČNS IFPI)	87
Spain (Promusicae)	85
South Korea International (Gaon)	18
Sweden Digital Songs (DigiListan)	5
UK Singles (Official Charts)	16
US Billboard Hot 100	29
US Dance Club Songs (Billboard)	1
US Pop Airplay (Billboard)	23

=== Monthly charts ===
Monthly chart performance for "Ooh La La"
Chart (2015)	Position
South Korea Foreign (Circle)	32

=== Year-end charts ===
Chart (2015)	Position
Belgium Urban (Ultratop Flanders)	69
US Dance Club Songs (Billboard)	32

== Certifications ==
Region	Certification	Certified units/sales
Poland (ZPAV)	Gold	10,000^{*}
South Korea (Gaon)	—	20,679
United States (RIAA)	Gold	500,000^{‡}
^{*} Sales figures based on certification alone.^{‡} Sales+streaming figures based on certification alone.

== Release history ==
Country	Date	Format	Label
Worldwide	May 4, 2015	Digital download	RCA
United States	May 5, 2015	Mainstream radio	RCA
United States	May 5, 2015	Rhythmic crossover radio	RCA
Italy	May 8, 2015	Mainstream radio	Sony Music
Germany	June 5, 2015	CD single	Sony Music
United Kingdom	June 14, 2015	Digital download	RCA

== See also ==
- List of number-one dance singles of 2015 (U.S.)
