= Make Me (Britney Spears song) =

2016 single by Britney Spears

Single by Britney Spears featuring G-Eazy

from the album Glory
- Released: July 15, 2016
- Recorded: 2015–2016
- Studio: 158 Studios (California); West Lake Village (California); Studio at the Palms (Las Vegas, NV); Sing Sing Studios (Melbourne)
- Genre: Pop; R&B
- Length: 3:51
- Label: RCA
- Songwriters: Britney Spears; Matthew Burns; Joe Janiak; Gerald Earl Gillum
- Producer: Burns

Britney Spears singles chronology
"Tom's Diner" (2015)	"Make Me" (2016)	"Slumber Party" (2016)

G-Eazy singles chronology
"You & Me" (2016)	"Make Me" (2016)	"Some Kind of Drug" (2016)

Music video
- "Make Me" on YouTube

"Make Me" (or "Make Me…") is the lead single of American singer Britney Spears's ninth studio album, Glory (2016). It features the vocal collaboration of American rapper G-Eazy. The track was written by Spears, Matthew Burns, Joe Janiak and Gerald Gillum, while produced by Burns, with Mischke Butler serving as a vocal producer. It was released on July 15, 2016, after being previously delayed due to reported production difficulties. Described as a "slinky" midtempo pop and R&B-influenced ballad, the recording incorporates "raw" guitar riffs, "snare slaps", "whooshing synths" and a "dub step-esque boom-bap" in its instrumentation. Lyrically, the song talks about demanding sexual satisfaction.

The song received generally favorable reviews from critics. Commercially, the song reached top-ten peaks in Hungary and Israel while reaching top-twenty in Canada, France, Scotland, top forty in Australia and the United States where it charted at number seventeen on the Billboard Hot 100 and topped the Dance Club Songs chart. As of April 2018, "Make Me" was certified platinum by the RIAA for combined sales and streams of one million units in the US. The first version of the song's music video, directed by David LaChapelle, was shelved. Subsequently, a Randee St. Nicholas-directed music video was released on August 5, 2016. "Make Me" was added to Spears's residency show Britney: Piece of Me, which was performed by Spears and G-Eazy at the 2016 MTV Video Music Awards and the 2016 iHeartRadio Music Festival.

== Background and release ==
On October 8, 2015, Spears posted on her Instagram account a picture of herself with British producer and DJ Burns, hinting a possible collaboration. At the time, the producer had production credits with Ellie Goulding, Pitbull and Calvin Harris, among others. In another picture with the producer, she also captioned American musician Mischke. Prior to their studio meeting, the producer had worked on the instrumental part of the track, mixing organic elements with "electronic stuff", as well as playing guitar, thus creating what would become "Make Me". Later, British songwriter Joe Janiak created the song's melody, and after meeting with Burns they created parts of the song's lyrics.

Spears's team then contacted the producer, claiming that they loved the track and they met to record it. As stated by Burns, "The vocal was one of my main focuses on this one because I wanted it to feel like there was some kind of emotion in that, which isn't necessarily in a lot of the most recent singles that she did. I wanted to steer away from that autotune kind of sound and have something much more natural sounding, so we spent a lot of time on the vocal and just getting it to where it sounded like she's actually singing it from the heart rather than it being too much production. I think we've achieved that."

It was initially announced by Las Vegas Sun that the song—reportedly titled "Make Me (Oooh)" at the time—would be released in May 2016, with Spears being scheduled to perform the single at the 2016 Billboard Music Awards, followed by an album release in June. However, due to production difficulties, the track was reported to be delayed until the summer, with no release date being provided. Robin Leach from the Las Vegas Sun claimed he was told that, "She's gone from pretty straight-forward pop to a really interesting vibe with a lot of really cool stuff." Later, on May 25, 2016, it was reported that American rapper G-Eazy was going to be featured on the track, which was the rumoured reason for the delay. On July 14, 2016, the single's cover art was released. It shows "her toned body while walking through the desert wrapped in a white piece of fabric" and wearing a "pair of thigh-high boots". The song was released on July 15, 2016 on the iTunes Store as a digital download. It was also released to a limited range of radio stations for early airplay and made available across streaming platforms the following day. It was serviced to contemporary hit radio on July 19, 2016. On August 29, 2016, RCA sent a studio version of the 2016 VMA Performance for pop radio called "VMA Eazy Remix".

== Composition and lyrics ==
"Make Me..."
A 24-second sample of "Make Me...", where a portion of the chorus is heard.

"Make Me..." was written by Spears, Matthew Burns, Joe Janiak and Gerald Gillum. It was produced by Burns, with vocal production being done by Mischke Butler. The song features American rapper G-Eazy. Jaycen Joshua was the song's mixing engineer and provided background vocals. According to the sheet music published at Musicnotes.com by Sony/ATV Music Publishing, "Make Me..." is written in the key of B♭ major with a tempo of 123 beats per minute in common time. The song follows a chord progression of B♭–Cm–Gm, and Spears's vocals span from G_{3} to E♭_{5}. "Make Me..." is a "slinky" mid-tempo pop and R&B-influenced ballad. It features "raw" guitar riffs, "soothing electronics", "snare slaps", "whooshing synths" and a "dub step-esque boom-bap". In the song, she uses her breathy vocals and "soulful crescendos of 'Make me oooh, oooh, oooh.'"

Lyrically, "Make Me..." talks about demanding sexual satisfaction, with the singer "want[ing] the object of her affection to make her move", explaining that "she's on the lookout for someone to 'raise [her] roof.'" In the chorus, she sings: "I just want you to make me move like it ain’t a choice for you, like you got a job to do/ Just want you to raise my roof, something sensational. And make me ooh, ooh, ooh." As noted by Billboard staff, the second part of the song features "sexy" lyrics such as "No rules/From the bar to the car, let's take it back to my room/Igniting the heat of the woman; let the sparks fuse/Blowing up to the ceiling, we're burning bright/When we cross the line." In the other hand, G-Eazy raps about "that he's not one to put too much stock in social status. All he's looking for is a 'dangerous woman' he can confide in."

== Critical reception ==
"Make Me" has received mostly positive reviews from most critics. Kevin O'Donnell of Entertainment Weekly gave "Make Me" an A− grade, calling the song a "woozy, future-funk burner...packed with whooshing synths and a seductive, dub step-esque boom-bap." Rachel Brodsky of Spin noted that Spears "sounds more awake than usual" on the track, noting that she "dusted herself off just fine from the Iggy Azalea disaster of last summer with a slick new single." Billboard Staff pointed out that, "Brit is at her sexy best on the new track." Michael Cragg of The Guardian noted that the song "takes aim at a current pop zeitgeist – that of the mood-drenched, slowed down sex jam – but this time walks away a clear victor." Allison Bowsher of Much noted that Spears "is at her sultry-best", calling it "a song worthy of a comeback". Sasha Geffen of MTV News was complimentary with the track, noting that it "fits perfectly alongside other recent hits asking dudes to do their due diligence after dark, like Fifth Harmony's 'Work from Home'," and praising the "simmering instrumental from L.A. producer Burns." David Canfield of Slate praised G-Eazy for "complement[ing] Spears's sound with seductive ease" and the song for "represent[ing] a return to form in its rhythm and in the singer's sultry vocal command."

Jeff Benjamin of Fuse observed that "the sweeping chorus boasts the playful, breathy coos that Brit has made a signature part of her discography and helps this stand out as a track to make Brit Army proud." Gerrick D. Kennedy of Los Angeles Times was also complimentary, praising Burns for crafting "a lush, down-tempo bedroom number that largely eschews the Vocoder and Auto-Tune effects that have dotted her most recent work." He called it "a song that allows the singer to sing —really sing" and noted that "Spears sounds better than she has in years", with her warm tone "commanding the track". Alim Kheraj of Digital Spy opined that "what's so refreshing is that Brit's signature vocals are given the space they need to shine; she sounds sexy, engaged and like she truly loves it." Kerensa Cadenas of Complex defined it as "fine [...] it's Britney meets 2016", noting that the song is "a bit melancholy but without fully becoming the #sadgirl dance pop of a Carly Rae Jepsen or Sky Ferreira."

== Chart performance ==
"Make Me..." debuted at number 17 on the US Billboard Hot 100 chart, becoming her 20th top-20 single on the Hot 100, 34th entry, and sixth-highest debut, tying with Spears's debut single "...Baby One More Time". It sold 96,000 copies during its first week, causing a debut at number three on Digital Songs, with 5.3 million domestic streams and 20 million audience impression in airplay. On the Hot 100, it dropped down to number 52 the following week. On the Mainstream Top 40, "Make Me..." debuted at number 31 and climbed to number 24 the following week. After the video's release, the song managed to rebound on the Hot 100, climbing from number 67 to number 43. Following the performance at the 2016 MTV Video Music Awards, the song jumped from number 58 to number 17; its previous peak position. It sold 71,000 copies. On Streaming Songs, "Make Me..." re-entered at number 33, becoming its peak position. "Make Me..." became Spears's tenth number one single on the Dance Club Songs chart, with Billboard crediting remixes by Cash Cash, Trace Adam, and the duo Marc Stout & Tony Arzadon in assisting in the song's position. In Australia, the song debuted and peaked at number 39, becoming Spears's 31st top-forty single. In France, the song debuted and peaked at number 11, her highest entry since "Work Bitch" (2013). In the United Kingdom, however, the song was Spears's first song to miss the top-forty since "Ooh La La" (2013), peaking at number 42. In Spain, "Make Me..." debuted and peaked at number 80.

== Music video ==
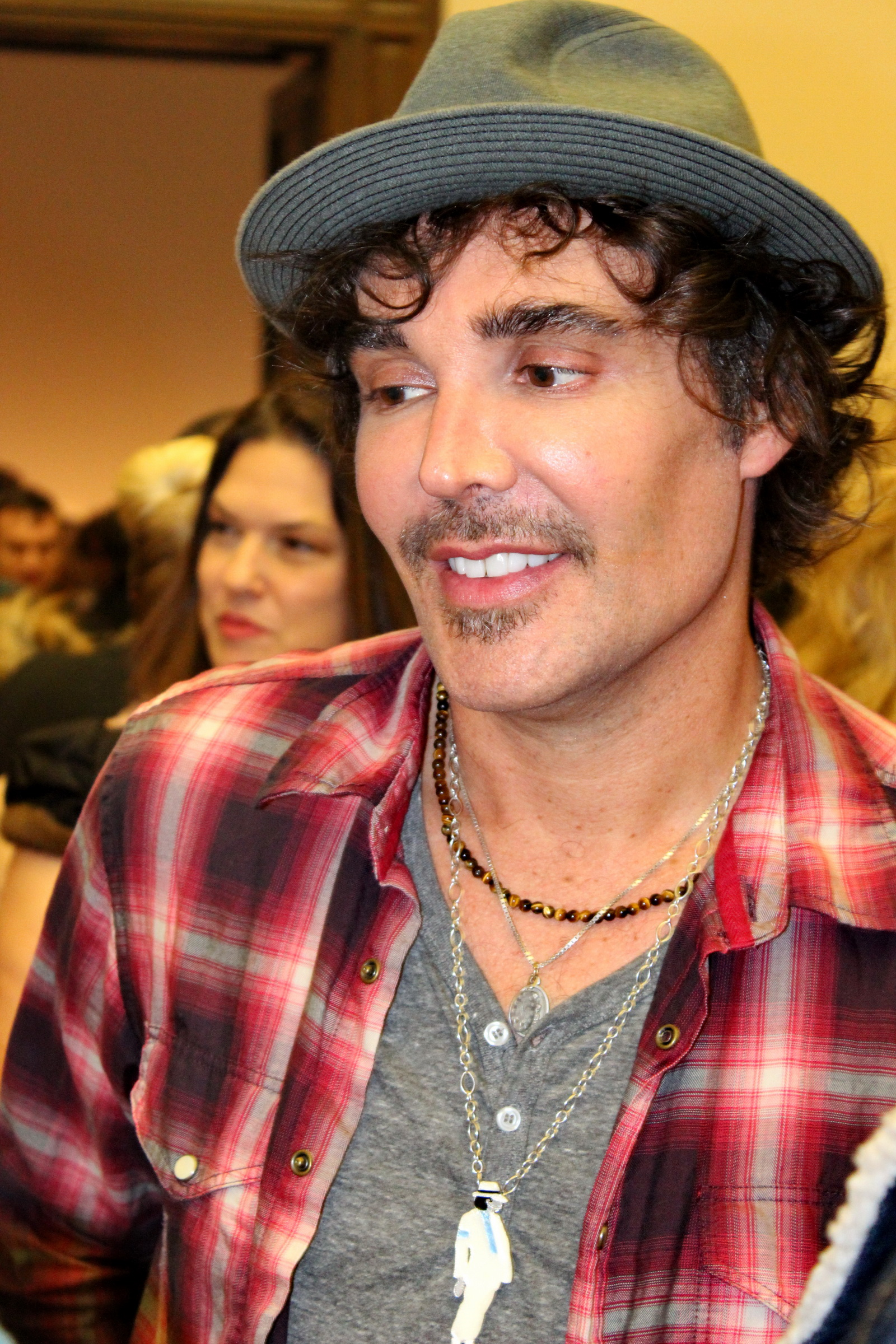
David LaChapelle directed the original video.

In early June 2016, it was reported that David LaChapelle, who previously directed the video for Spears's 2004 single "Everytime", would serve as the director for the music video. Spears teased scenes of the original video online, which featured numerous backup dancers and a variety of risqué outfits. Scenes from the LaChapelle video managed to leak online, featuring men "hanging off poles next to leopards" and Spears "baring all with nothing but sparkly body paint" inside a cage. RCA Records ultimately opted to support a final, tamer music video, which was filmed on July 16, 2016 with director Randee St. Nicholas. In late July 2016, Spears commented on the video, stating: "The video that I just shot is me and all my girls. We're making guys audition for us. The whole theme is us basically playing with them. It's really kind of fun and it's interesting." Ultimately, the video officially premiered via Vevo on August 5, 2016, less than three weeks after having been filmed. On September 20, 2016, an alternate version of the video was released through the mobile game Britney Spears: American Dream, which cut out the narrative of the video and solely includes Spears's hall sequences and glamour shots. The original LaChapelle-directed music video was leaked on April 12, 2019. Following the leak, however, LaChapelle distanced himself from the video, claiming it was "not [his] video".

As described by Daniel Kreps of Rolling Stone, the video "offers a lighthearted, fictionalized look at the audition process to cast Spears' on-screen paramour in the 'Make Me' video. When Spears and her posse aren't giggling through auditions, the singer is performing her track in a brightly lit hallway. G-Eazy also appears to deliver his featured verse via hi-def monitor. The video concludes with Spears screen-testing her would-be costars in a series of steamy sequences."

After an overwhelmingly negative response from critics and fans following the release of the Randee St. Nicholas-directed video, a petition demanding RCA to release LaChapelle's original video was created; the petition described the released video as one that was "not a suitable representation of the song". Sources claimed the video was rejected by Spears for being "too sexy". A month after the video's release, Spears's manager, Larry Rudolph commented: "It's really simple. The video just didn't work [...] because it's Britney there are all kinds of conspiracies. Nobody is hiding anything."

== Live performances ==
On August 18, 2016, Spears added "Make Me", as well as "Do You Wanna Come Over?", to the setlist of her residency show Britney: Piece of Me, which extended to her Britney: Live in Concert world tour's setlist a year later. Spears and G-Eazy performed "Make Me...", along with G-Eazy's "Me, Myself & I", live for the first time at the 2016 MTV Video Music Awards on August 28, 2016. The performance opened "with Britney's silhouette performing behind a glowing panel while massive, shadowy arms reach for her, trying to grab her without ever quite succeeding", while Spears performed the first verse and chorus of "Make Me...". Following G-Eazy's entrance, Spears performed the chorus of "Me, Myself & I", "while crawling under his legs", before finishing the performance with a repeated chorus of "Make Me...". Jeff Benjamin of Fuse called it a "fun" performance, where "Britney made a triumphant return to the VMA stage." Joe Lynch of Billboard considered the performance "as beguiling as the song itself", naming it a "solid VMA return for Britney". Jennifer Keishin Armstrong of the same magazine declared that "Spears acquitted herself nicely, if not particularly memorably." Chris Payne also from Billboard included the performance among the "worst moments" of the night. Joyce Chen of Us Weekly labeled it as a "less-than-stellar performance."

On September 1, 2016, a performance of the song was broadcast from Planet Hollywood in Las Vegas for Today. On September 24, 2016, on the iHeartRadio Music Festival, Spears and G-Eazy once again performed the "Make Me..." and "Me, Myself & I" medley, as the final performance from Spears's set. In the United Kingdom, Spears performed the song on the Apple Music Festival on September 27, 2016, and The Jonathan Ross Show on October 1, 2016. On December 2, 2016, Spears performed the song at the KIIS-FM Jingle Ball. A day later, she reprised the performance at 99.7's Triple Ho Show. Afterwards, she performed it at the B96's Pepsi Jingle Bash on December 10, 2016.

== Track listing ==
- Digital download
1. "Make Me..." featuring G-Eazy – 3:51
- The Remixes
1. "Make Me..." featuring G-Eazy (Cash Cash Remix) – 4:07
2. "Make Me..." featuring G-Eazy (Marc Stout & Tony Arzadon Remix) – 3:59
3. "Make Me..." featuring G-Eazy (Tom Bundin Remix) – 3:09
- The Remixes EP
1. "Make Me..." featuring G-Eazy (Cash Cash Remix) – 4:07
2. "Make Me..." featuring G-Eazy (Marc Stout & Tony Arzadon Remix) – 3:59
3. "Make Me..." featuring G-Eazy (Tom Bundin Remix) – 3:09
4. "Make Me..." featuring G-Eazy (Kris Kross Amsterdam Remix) – 3:11
5. "Make Me..." featuring G-Eazy (FTampa Remix) – 3:15

== Credits and personnel ==
Credits for "Make Me..." adapted from Glory liner notes.

Technical

- Britney Spears's vocals recorded at 158 Studios, California; West Lake Village, California; The Studio at the Palms, Las Vegas, New York.
- G-Eazy's vocals recorded at Sing Sing Recording Studios, Melbourne, Australia.
- Mixed at Larrabee Studios, North Hollywood, California.

Personnel

- Britney Spears – lead vocals, background vocals, songwriting
- Burns – songwriting, production, recording
- Joe Janiak – songwriting, additional background vocals, mixing
- G-Eazy – vocals, songwriting
- Mischke Butler – vocal production
- Benny Faccone – assistant vocal production
- Rob Katz – assistant vocal production
- Aaron Dobos – vocal recording
- Dave Nakaji – mixing assistant
- Maddox Chimm – mixing assistant

== Charts ==
=== Weekly charts ===
Weekly chart performance for "Make Me"
Chart (2016)	Peak position
Australia (ARIA)	39
Austria (Ö3 Austria Top 40)	61
Belgium (Ultratip Bubbling Under Flanders)	33
Belgium (Ultratip Bubbling Under Wallonia)	17
Canada Hot 100 (Billboard)	20
Canada CHR/Top 40 (Billboard)	18
Canada Hot AC (Billboard)	30
Czech Republic Singles Digital (ČNS IFPI)	51
Finland Download (Latauslista)	8
France (SNEP)	11
Germany (GfK)	71
Greece Digital Song Sales (Billboard)	9
Hungary (Single Top 40)	6
Ireland (IRMA)	51
Israel International Airplay (Media Forest)	9
Italy (FIMI)	56
Japan Hot 100 (Billboard)	46
Netherlands (Dutch Top 40 Tipparade)	18
New Zealand Heatseekers (RMNZ)	3
Portugal (AFP)	51
Scottish Singles Sales (Official Charts)	17
Slovakia Singles Digital (ČNS IFPI)	52
South Korea International (Circle)	30
Spain (Promusicae)	80
Sweden Digital Song Sales (Billboard)	5
Sweden Heatseeker (Sverigetopplistan)	5
Switzerland (Schweizer Hitparade)	58
UK Singles (Official Charts)	42
US Billboard Hot 100	17
US Adult Pop Airplay (Billboard)	34
US Dance Club Songs (Billboard)	1
US Pop Airplay (Billboard)	20

=== Year-end charts ===
Year-end chart performance for "Make Me"
Chart (2016)	Position
US Dance Club Songs (Billboard)	32

== Certifications ==
Certifications for "Make Me"
Region	Certification	Certified units/sales
Canada (Music Canada)	Gold	40,000^{‡}
Mexico (AMPROFON)	Gold	30,000^{‡}
United States (RIAA)	Platinum	1,000,000^{‡}
^{‡} Sales+streaming figures based on certification alone.

== Release history ==
Release history for "Make Me"
Region	Date	Format(s)	Version	Label	Ref.
Various	July 15, 2016	Digital download; streaming	Original	RCA	
Italy	July 15, 2016	Radio airplay	Original	Sony	
United States	July 19, 2016	Contemporary hit radio	Original	RCA	
Italy	July 27, 2016	Radio airplay	No rap	Sony	
Various	August 12, 2016	Digital download; streaming	The remixes	RCA	
United States	August 29, 2016	Contemporary hit radio	VMA remix	RCA	

== See also ==
- List of Billboard Dance Club Songs number ones of 2016
