= Mind Your Business (song) =

2023 single by will.i.am and Britney Spears

Single by will.i.am and Britney Spears
- Released: July 21, 2023
- Recorded: c. 2013; 2023
- Genre: EDM
- Length: 3:15
- Label: Epic
- Songwriters: Anthony Preston; Britney Spears; Johnny Goldstein; William Adams
- Producers: will.i.am; Johnny Goldstein

will.i.am singles chronology
"The Formula" (2023)	"Mind Your Business" (2023)	"East LA" (2025)

Britney Spears singles chronology
"Hold Me Closer" (2022)	"Mind Your Business" (2023)

Audio video
- "Mind Your Business" on YouTube

"Mind Your Business" is a song by American recording artists will.i.am and Britney Spears, released through Epic Records on July 21, 2023. The single marks will.i.am and Spears's fourth collaboration, following "Big Fat Bass" (2011), "Scream & Shout" (2012), and "It Should Be Easy" (2013). "Mind Your Business" received mostly negative reviews, with reviewers criticizing the production, vocals, and lyrics.

== Background and release ==
Music is therapy for lots of people. Dancing is therapy for lots of people [...] and when you have that connection with music and rhythm and song and melody and harmony, and you express yourself through that, it helps you with anything that you're going through, and I see that every time I see [Britney] dance on her Instagram. I light up because I see how much she loves music. To collaborate with her now and then — when you're in the studio and you're making music, that's the only thing that matters — so I see the same light, the same joy, the same love and passion.

— will.i.am on collaborating with Spears on the song and catharsis of music and dance, Variety

In September 2022, will.i.am hinted at a collaboration with Spears on Good Morning Britain, stating that "there's been things in the works", but did not elaborate further. The two artists had previously collaborated on the songs "Big Fat Bass" (2011), "Scream & Shout" (2012), and "It Should Be Easy" (2013). The latter appeared on Spears's eighth studio album Britney Jean (2013), of which will.i.am produced a number of other songs for and also executive produced.

On July 17, 2023, will.i.am announced the collaboration on his social media, along with a snippet of the song and its pre-save link. It featured a lyric from "Scream & Shout": "You are now, now rockin' with will.i.am and Britney, bitch". A new lyric sung by Spears over an uptempo beat was also previewed: "Mind your business, bitch!".

"Mind Your Business" was announced on July 18, 2023 and released to streaming platforms and digital formats on July 21, 2023. The single was Spears's first release in nearly a year since "Hold Me Closer" (2022). She revealed in a Vogue interview that the collaboration was recorded "years ago and it was time [to] re-produce it and share it with my incredible fans."

A remix by David Guetta was released on September 1, 2023 to mixed reviews among fans.

== Artwork ==
The cover art for the single was unveiled on July 19, 2023. It depicts both artists standing against each other's backs, wearing black outfits containing hints of pink. A 2003 picture of Spears, taken by photographer Mark Liddell, was used for her appearance on the artwork, which prompted questions over how involved Spears actually was in the project. Journalists pointed out how neither performers look their current age on the cover image, and was named "the first sign of catastrophe" around the song.

== Critical reception ==
"Mind Your Business" was panned by the critics and fans alike. Jamie Tabberer at Attitude rated it one out of five stars, criticizing will.i.am for his "foolishly bad judgement" in releasing the song, labelling it as "unlistenable" with lyrics that are "utter nonsense" and believed that Spears was "almost entirely absent from this project" as "she sounds nothing like herself". Alexa Camp of Slant Magazine also gave the song a negative review, calling it "mind-numbingly repetitive" and "dumb", featuring "robotic, sliced-and-diced vocal from Spears." Jezebel's Rich Juzwiak wrote, "if you told me this song was AI doing Britney, I wouldn't have been surprised at all." Naming it Spears's "worst song ever", Lyric Waiwiri-Smith of New Zealand news media Stuff pointed out the "beat that sounds like the work of a child playing on a toy DJ mixer" and the "nonsensical" lyrics, which are "a mash-up of internet colloquialisms and random words bunched together without any real meaning". Writing for British newspaper i, Emily Bootle described the track as "artificial, forgettable and harsh" and "the most perfunctory kind of pop music you can imagine". She further raised concern over Spears's well-being after the end of her conservatorship, saying "there is little to celebrate about Spears being back in the pop limelight if she is simply being used as a puppet of her former self, in order to further other people's commercial agendas".

Conversely, Bianca Betancourt of Harper's Bazaar found it to be a "triumphant return" for Spears and "a certified bop". At Consequence, the track was described as "fun, danceable", "with a driving beat and the repeating refrain, 'Mind your business, bitch,' the single features everything you'd want from a collaboration between the two pop icons."

== Commercial performance ==
In the United States, "Mind Your Business" did not debut on the Billboard Hot 100; however, it became Spears's fourth and will.i.am's second number-one on the Dance/Electronic Digital Song Sales chart with over 4,600 sales in the first week. The song peaked at number eight on the Dance/Electronic Songs chart, earning Spears her fourth top-ten, and will.i.am his third. It initially charted for four consecutive weeks, eventually falling to number 47. It also peaked at number 12 on the all-genre Digital Songs chart, only missing the top-ten by around 1,200 copies. Following the release of the David Guetta remix, "Mind Your Business" re-entered the Dance/Electronic Songs chart at number 33. "Mind Your Business" charted on various digital sales charts around the world including number eight in Germany, number 11 in the United Kingdom Singles Sales Chart, and number 16 in Canada. It also charted on several Latin Anglo airplay charts.

== Accolades ==
Organizations	Year	Category	Result	Ref.
RTHK Top 10 Gold Songs Awards	2023	Top Ten International Gold Songs	Nominated	

== Track listing ==
- Digital download and streaming
1. "Mind Your Business" – 3:15
- CD
1. "Mind Your Business" – 3:16
2. "Mind Your Business" (radio edit) – 3:13
- Digital download and streaming (David Guetta remix)
1. "Mind Your Business" (David Guetta remix) – 1:58

== Credits and personnel ==
Credits and personnel are adapted from Spotify.

- Anthony Preston – writer
- Britney Spears – writer, vocals
- Johnny Goldstein – writer, producer
- will.i.am – writer, vocals, producer

== Charts ==
Chart performance for "Mind Your Business"
Chart (2023)	Peak position
Argentina Anglo Airplay (Monitor Latino)	13
Canadian Digital Song Sales (Billboard)	16
Central America Anglo Airplay (Monitor Latino)	9
Chile Anglo Airplay (Monitor Latino)	5
Ecuador Anglo Airplay (Monitor Latino)	15
El Salvador Anglo Airplay (Monitor Latino)	4
France (Club 40)	11
Germany Digital Sales (Official German Charts)	8
Guatemala Anglo Airplay (Monitor Latino)	8
Honduras Anglo Airplay (Monitor Latino)	8
Israel International Airplay (Media Forest)	6
Latvia Airplay (TopHit)	30
Lithuania Airplay (TopHit)	37
Netherlands (Tipparade)	26
New Zealand Hot Singles (RMNZ)	27
Nicaragua Anglo Airplay (Monitor Latino)	5
Panama Anglo Airplay (Monitor Latino)	9
UK Singles Downloads (Official Charts)	10
UK Singles Sales (OCC)	11
Uruguay Anglo Airplay (Monitor Latino)	11
US Digital Song Sales (Billboard)	12
US Hot Dance/Electronic Songs (Billboard)	8

== Release history ==
Release dates and formats for "Mind Your Business"
Region	Date	Format(s)	Version(s)	Label	Ref.
Various	July 21, 2023	Digital download; streaming	Original	Epic	
Italy	July 21, 2023	Radio airplay	Original	Sony	
United States	August 8, 2023	CD	Original; radio edit	Epic	
Various	September 1, 2023	Digital download; streaming	David Guetta remix	Epic	
