= Don't Cry (disambiguation) =

"Don't Cry" is a 1991 song by Guns N' Roses.

Don't Cry may also refer to:

== Books ==
- Don't Cry, by Beverly Barton, 2010
- Don't Cry, by Mary Gaitskill, 2009

== Films ==
- Don't Cry (film), 2022 animated short by Hisham Zreiq

== Songs ==
- "Don't Cry" (Asia song), 1983
- "Don't Cry" (Édith Piaf song), 1951
- "Don't Cry" (Human Nature song), 1999
- "Don't Cry" (Lil Wayne song), 2018
- "Don't Cry" (Seal song), 1995
- "Don't Cry", by 2NE1 from the 2011 album 2NE1
- "Don't Cry", by Brian Poole, 1964
- "Don't Cry", by Britney Spears from the 2013 album Britney Jean
- "Don't Cry", by Budgie from the 1982 album Deliver Us from Evil
- "Don't Cry", by Dave Gahan and Soulsavers from the 2015 album Angels & Ghosts
- "Don't Cry", by J. Dilla from the 2006 album Donuts
- "Don't Cry", by Joe, from the 1956 musical the Most Happy Fella
- "Don't Cry", by Ken Laszlo, 1986
- "Don't Cry", by Kirk Franklin from the 2002 album the Rebirth of Kirk Franklin
- "Don't Cry", by Mark Wynter, 1963
- "Don't Cry", by Neil Young from the 1989 album Freedom
- "Don't Cry", by Ruel from the 2019 EP Free Time

== Other uses ==
- "Don't Cry / I Love to Party", a 2006 double A-side by Kaye Styles and Johnny Logan

== See also ==
- Don't Cry for Me (disambiguation)
