= Alien (Britney Spears song) =

2013 song by Britney Spears

Song by Britney Spears

from the album Britney Jean
- Released: November 29, 2013
- Studio: Guerrilla Studios (London)
- Genre: Dance-pop
- Length: 3:56
- Label: RCA
- Songwriters: Britney Spears; William Orbit; Dan Traynor; Ana Diaz; Anthony Preston
- Producers: William Orbit; HyGrade

Audio video
- "Alien" on YouTube

"Alien" is a song recorded by American singer Britney Spears for her eighth studio album, Britney Jean (2013). It was written by Spears, William Orbit, Dan Traynor, Ana Diaz, and Anthony Preston, and produced by Orbit and HyGrade. "Alien" is a mid-tempo dance-pop song, which lyrically discusses Spears's feelings of loneliness.

"Alien" received acclaim from music critics, who appreciated its production and recognized it as being among the more personal offerings from the record. The track peaked at number eight on the US Bubbling Under Hot 100 and debuted at 147 on the French Singles Chart despite not being a single from Britney Jean. The track has been performed during Spears's residency concert, Britney: Piece of Me (2014).

== Background ==
After serving as a judge on the second season of the American version of The X Factor, Spears began work on her eighth studio album in December 2012. In May 2013, record producer William Orbit was announced to be working on the project. Upon the announcement of her record in September 2013, titled Britney Jean, Spears described her collaboration with Orbit, titled "Alien", as "really cool" and "really great". Early reports speculated that the song would feature American recording artist Lady Gaga, as suggested by a tweet posted to Twitter by executive producer will.i.am, although such a collaboration never came to fruition.

On November 18, 2013, preceding the release date of Britney Jean on December 3, a demo version of the track was leaked online; Orbit commented that it was the "right song [with the] wrong chorus notes", which had been corrected on the final production. On December 22, 2013, Spears announced through her E! documentary special I Am Britney Jean that "Alien" would likely be released as a single from Britney Jean, although it never came to fruition.

In July 2014, an audio leaked of Spears singing the song without pitch correction. James Lachno of The Daily Telegraph noted that Spears struggles to project her voice and reach the song's high notes. Critics described Spears' vocal performance in the leaked track as "flat at best and, at worst, like a strangled cat", "noticeably off-key", "unpolished [and] unflattering", "a style that might kindly be described as tentative", and "toxic to the ears". CNN defended the track, saying that its quality is irrelevant as Spears is not known for her vocal ability. Orbit claimed that the audio was a vocal warm up, not expected to be a take, and not intended to be heard by the public, adding, "Whomever put this on the internet must have done so in a spirit of unkindness, but it can in no way detract from the fact that Britney is and always will be beyond stellar! She is magnificent! And that’s that."

== Composition ==
"Alien" is a midtempo dance-pop song; it was written by Spears, William Orbit, Dan Traynor, Ana Diaz, and Anthony Preston. Its production is handled by Orbit and HyGrade. Genevieve Koski from The A.V. Club felt that its musical style "[picked] up where Femme Fatale's folk-laced closer "Criminal" left off [by opening] Britney Jean with an intriguing folktronica departure". Greg Kot from the Chicago Tribune described the production as a "light, airy slice of melancholic dance-pop, reminiscent of Madonna's Orbit-produced Ray of Light album." Nick Catucci from Entertainment Weekly stated that "Alien" is a "gently pulsing track in which an actual extraterrestrial finally realizes she's 'not alone,' and repeats the phrase until it is pitchshifted up like a departing space ship."

=== Vocal glitch controversy ===
Two minutes and fourteen seconds into the song, a vocal glitch is present as Spears sings the lyrics "and the light in your eyes", over which Orbit revealed that "there is actually a long story behind all of this which [he] would love to tell", and noted that "what has been called the 'demo' is not in fact the actual original demo." Orbit joked about the matter, saying that the true cause of the glitch is that they "were kidnapped by Aliens and actually spent a year on their ship making friends, doing shows, creating Alien music [...] Then we travelled back to 2:14 in the track, with just that glitch to show for it." On January 25, 2014, Orbit hinted on Twitter that the glitch might be a fail of production held by the album's executive producer, will.i.am: "Remember 'Glitchgate'? I assure you all that there will.be.no[sic] more glitches".

== Critical reception ==
"Alien" received general acclaim from music critics, who appreciated its production and recognized it as being among the more personal offerings from the record. Stephen Thomas Erlewine of AllMusic noted that Orbit was the only producer associated with the project that appropriately handled "[Spears'] sad, existential loneliness [by] placing it firmly in the center" of the track. Genevieve Koski from The A.V. Club complimented Spears for recording a midtempo track, which she felt showcased her vocal abilities better than the "robo-coo" that Spears is commonly associated with. Writing for Chicago Tribune, Greg Kot opined that "Alien" was the only song from Britney Jean that felt "vulnerable [and] personal".

Nick Catucci of Entertainment Weekly shared a similar sentiment, expressing enjoyment of the "weird and wonderful intimacy" of the track, while Michael Gragg of The Guardian appreciated the experimental nature of its production. Kevin Harley from The Independent made favorable comparisons to Ray of Light by Madonna, and felt that "Alien" was one of Spears' stronger "multi-producer alliances" from the record. Writing for Slant Magazine, Sal Cinquemani saw "Alien" as an opportunity in which Spears successfully "[pushed her] sound forward", though Barry Walters from Spin felt that her vocal performance failed to match the more solemn production of the song.

In light of the leaked audio, Lucas Villa of AXS listed "Alien" as the fifth best song of 2014, calling it a "gorgeous folktronica tune" that "hit home for the oft-guarded singer." He added that "[h]opefully all the fuss led people to the original version, one of Spears' best recent works."

== Live performances ==
Spears performed "Alien" during her residency concert Britney: Piece of Me, held by Planet Hollywood Las Vegas in Las Vegas. During a notable performance of the track on February 19, 2014, Spears was revealed to have been lip synching when the backing track continued playing and she missed her cue while interacting with the audience. When the April 2014 leg of Britney: Piece of Me began, "Alien" was cut in favor of "Do Somethin'". Following her breakup with her boyfriend David Lucado in August 2014, Spears removed "Perfume" from the set list for few shows in favor of "Alien". Spears performed "Alien" ten times throughout February and August 2014.

== Credits and personnel ==
Credits adapted from the liner notes of Britney Jean.

Recording

- Engineered at Guerrilla Studios, London
- Mixed at MixStar Studios, Virginia Beach, Virginia

Personnel

- Ana Diaz – songwriter, additional vocals
- John Hanes – engineering for mixing
- HyGrade – producer
- Alan O'Connell – engineer
- William Orbit – songwriter, producer, instruments, programming
- Anthony Preston – songwriter, vocal producer
- Britney Spears – background vocals, lead vocals, songwriter
- Dan Traynor – songwriter
- Alan Tilston – engineering
- Serban Ghenea – mixing

== Charts ==
"Alien" debuted at number 147 on the French Singles Chart, published by the Syndicat National de l'Édition Phonographique. For the week of July 26, 2014, "Alien" debuted at number eight on the US Billboard Bubbling Under Hot 100 chart.

Chart (2013–14)	Peak position
France (SNEP)	147
South Korea International Singles (Gaon)	90
US Bubbling Under Hot 100 (Billboard)	8
