= I Would Die for You =

I Would Die for You may refer to:

== Songs ==
- "I Would Die for You", a single by Jann Arden from Time for Mercy 1993
  - "I Would Die For You", a cover of Arden's song by Regine Velasquez from Listen Without Prejudice
- "I Would Die 4 U", a song by Prince
- "(I Would) Die for You" or "Die for You", a song by Elena Paparizou as Antique, written Nikos Terzis 2001
- "I Would Die For You", a song by Matt Walters
- "I Would Die For You", a song by Fady Maalouf from Blessed
- "I Would Die For You", a song by Esthetic Education from Face Reading
- "I Would Die For You", a song by Christian rock band MercyMe from Coming Up to Breathe
- "I Would Die For You", a song by Melodie MC
- "I Would Die For You", a song by Darius Danesh
- "I Would Die For You", a song by Wetton Downes from Wetton Downes
  - "I Would Die For You", a version of Wetton and Downes song by Asia from Gravitas
- "I Would Die For You", a song by Loverboy from Just Getting Started
- "I Would Die for You" (Miley Cyrus song), from the 2017 album Younger Now
- "Moriría por vos" ("I Would Die For You"), a song by Amaral from Estrella de mar

== Games ==
- Feel the Magic: XY/XX, originally known as Kimi no Tame nara Shineru or "I Would Die For You"

== See also ==
- Die for You (disambiguation)
