= Die for You =

Die for You may refer to:

== Albums ==
- Die for You (album), by Antique, 2001

== Books ==
- Die for You, a 2009 novel by Lisa Unger

== Songs ==
- "Die for You" (The Weeknd song), 2016
- "Die for You" (Joji song), 2022
- "Die for You", by Alice Cooper on the 1991 album Hey Stoopid
- "Die for You", by Black Veil Brides on the 2011 album Set the World on Fire
- "Die for You", by Falling in Reverse on the 2015 album Just Like You
- "Die for You", by Joel Adams, 2017
- "Die for You", by Justin Bieber featuring Dominic Fike, on the 2021 album Justice
- "Die for You", promotional single by Kim Petras, 2009
- "Die for You", by Pennywise on the 2008 album Reason to Believe
- "Die for You", by Pentagon on the 2020 album Universe: The Black Hall
- "Die for You", by Red on the 2013 album Release the Panic
- "Die for You", by Starset from the 2017 album Vessels
- "Die for You", by Grabbitz for the 2021 Valorant Champions
- "Die for You", by From Ashes to New from the 2026 album Reflections

== See also ==
- "Die4U", a 2021 song by Bring Me the Horizon
- "Die 4U", a 2026 song by Tyga
- "Die 4 You", a 2023 song by Dean
- Die for Me (disambiguation)
- I Would Die for You (disambiguation)
- To Die For (disambiguation)
- Cry for You (disambiguation)
