= Die for Me =

Die for Me may refer to:

- "Die for Me" (Post Malone song), featuring Future and Halsey, 2019
- "Die for Me" (Zayn song), 2026
- "Die for Me", a song by Ten from the 2014 album Albion
- "Die for Me", a song by T.S.O.L. from the 2008 album Live from Long Beach

== Other uses ==
- Killing Eve: Die for Me, 2020 novel by Luke Jennings
- "Die 4 Me", 2023 re-recording by Halsey of the Post Malone song

== See also ==
- Die for You (disambiguation)
- Cry for Me (disambiguation)
