= 2 Die 4 (disambiguation) =

"2 Die 4" is a 2023 song by Addison Rae featuring Charli XCX.

2 Die 4 may also refer to:

- "2 Die 4", a 2005 song by John 5 from Songs for Sanity
- "2 Die 4", a 2002 song by Superheist from Identical Remote Controlled Reactions
- "2 Die 4", a 2022 song by Tove Lo from Dirt Femme
- 2 Die 4, a 2009 novel by Nigel Hinton

== See also ==
- To Die For (disambiguation)
