= Cry for You =

Cry for You may refer to:

- "Cry for You" (September song), 2006
- "Cry for You" (Jodeci song), 1993
- "Cry for You", a song by Arashi from the 2007 album Time

== See also ==
- Cry for You – The Album, by September, 2008
- Cry for Me (disambiguation)
- Die for You (disambiguation)
