= It Should Be Easy =

2014 single by Britney Spears

Single by Britney Spears featuring will.i.am

from the album Britney Jean
- Released: June 13, 2014
- Recorded: 2013
- Studio: What a Music Studios (Ibiza, Spain); Piano Music Studios (Amsterdam, Netherlands); The Future (Los Angeles, CA); Glenwood Place Studios (Burbank, CA); Record Plant (Los Angeles, CA)
- Genre: EDM
- Length: 3:26
- Label: RCA
- Songwriters: Britney Spears; William Adams; David Guetta; Giorgio Tuinfort; Nick Rotteveel; Marcus van Wattum
- Producers: David Guetta; Giorgio Tuinfort; Nicky Romero; Marcus van Wattum; will.i.am; Anthony Preston

Britney Spears singles chronology
"Til It's Gone" (2013)	"It Should Be Easy" (2014)	"Pretty Girls" (2015)

will.i.am singles chronology
"It's My Birthday" (2014)	"It Should Be Easy" (2014)	"Home" (2014)

Audio video
- "It Should Be Easy" on YouTube

"It Should Be Easy" is a song recorded by American singer Britney Spears for her eighth studio album, Britney Jean (2013). It features the vocal collaboration of American rapper will.i.am. The song was written by Spears, will.i.am, David Guetta, Giorgio Tuinfort, Nicky Romero and Marcus van Wattum. According to EarOne, it was made available to Italian radio stations on June 13, 2014. It is the third collaboration between Spears and will.i.am, following "Big Fat Bass" from Spears' seventh studio album Femme Fatale (2011), and "Scream & Shout" from will.i.am's fourth studio album #willpower (2013).

== Background and release ==
In May 2013, will.i.am was confirmed as the executive producer of Spears' eighth studio album Britney Jean, which was released in December 2013. He described that his recording process differed from his past experience with the Black Eyed Peas, elaborating that "[he and Spears] had these juicy sessions, where [they had] been bonding, building the trust and comfort."

Official remixes for "It Should Be Easy" were commissioned and serviced to clubs in January 2014. A spokesperson for Spears said that it would not see a release as a third single and that the remixes were "commissioned purely to be used in nightclubs". However, on June 13, 2014, the song was made available to Italian radio stations, according to EarOne.

== Composition ==
"It Should Be Easy" is a EDM-inspired song that whose lyrics is about how love "shouldn't be complicated", with Spears imagining a bright-normal-future with a man who's stolen her heart. Spears' vocals has been called and considered "robotic" in the song.

== Critical reception ==
Michael Cragg from The Guardian in his review of the album, called the song an "Auto-Tune blitzkrieg" that misplaces the proclamations about the album being personal or a reinvention of Spears. Writing for Glamour, Christopher Rosa thought it "turns BritBrit into a robot" and "features an EDM breakdown that sounds dated upon delivery", and he named it Spears's fifth-worst song of all time. Rob Sheffield of Rolling Stone designated Spears a pioneer in the use of Auto-Tune but thought its use on "It Should Be Easy" was questionable: "[will.i.am] just punches in her vocals syllable by syllable, till it sounds like a 'blink twice if you're in danger' hostage crisis. An atrocity, especially the way he makes her sing the line, 'You bring me Zen.'"

Nicki Catucci from Entertainment Weekly compared the song with "Body Ache", another track on Britney Jean produced by Guetta, calling both songs "lousy" with anonymous female hook singers, "but these two songs transcend DJ filler because Britney never soft-pedals her voice's uneasy layering of girly and libidinous. They're based more in tension than release".

== Chart performance ==
"It Should Be Easy" charted at number 121 in France, number 88 in Canada and number 71 in Switzerland due to digital downloads. It also managed to peak at number 57 in Belgium. The song failed to chart on the Billboard Hot 100, but peaked at number 16 on the US Hot Dance/Electronic Songs and number 43 on the US Pop Digital Songs chart.

== Credits and personnel ==
Credits adapted from AllMusic.

- Britney Spears – lead vocals, songwriting
- will.i.am – guest vocals, songwriting, instrumentation, production, vocal production
- David Guetta – songwriting, engineer, instrumentation, production
- Nicky Romero – songwriting, instrumentation, mixing, production
- Giorgio Tuinfort – songwriting, engineer, instrumentation, production
- Marcus van Wattum – songwriting, instrumentation, mixing, production
- Anthony Preston – songwriting, instrumentation, production, vocal production

== Charts ==
=== Weekly charts ===
Weekly chart performance
Chart (2013)	Peak position
Belgium (Ultratip Bubbling Under Flanders)	57
Canada Hot 100 (Billboard)	88
Canada Digital Song Sales (Billboard)	54
France (SNEP)	121
Lebanon (Lebanese Top 20)	16
South Korea (Circle)	68
South Korea Foreign (Circle)	3
Switzerland (Schweizer Hitparade)	71
US Hot Dance/Electronic Songs (Billboard)	16
US Pop Digital Songs (Billboard)	43

=== Year-end charts ===
Chart (2013)	Position
South Korea (Gaon International Chart)	163

== Sales ==
Region	Certification	Certified units/sales
South Korea (Gaon)	—	70,455
