= Don't Cry for Me (disambiguation) =

"Don't Cry for Me" is a 1997 song by Lisa Stansfield.

Don't Cry for Me may also refer to:

- "Don't Cry for Me" (Alok, Martin Jensen and Jason Derulo song), 2020
- "Don't Cry for Me", a song by Stormzy featuring Raleigh Ritchie, from Gang Signs & Prayer, 2017

== See also ==
- Cry for Me (disambiguation)
- Don't Cry (disambiguation)
