= Perfume (Britney Spears song) =

2013 single by Britney Spears

Single by Britney Spears

from the album Britney Jean
- Released: October 22, 2013
- Recorded: July 2013
- Studio: Guerilla Studios (London)
- Genre: Synth-pop
- Length: 3:59
- Label: RCA
- Songwriters: Britney Spears; Sia Furler; Christopher Braide
- Producers: will.i.am; Keith Harris; Christopher Braide

Britney Spears singles chronology
"Work Bitch" (2013)	"Perfume" (2013)	"Pretty Girls" (2015)

Music video
- "Perfume" on YouTube

"Perfume" is a song by American singer Britney Spears, taken from her eighth studio album, Britney Jean (2013). It was written by Spears, Sia and Christopher Braide, while the song was produced by will.i.am and co-produced by Keith Harris and Braide. The song was released as the second single from the album on October 22, 2013 by RCA Records. "Perfume" is a synth-pop power ballad, which is influenced by music of the 1980s. Lyrically, the song is built around themes of jealousy and suspicion in a relationship. Spears revealed that the song was about her split with her ex-fiancé, Jason Trawick, in early 2013.

A musical departure from its EDM-influenced predecessor "Work Bitch", music critics noted her "surprisingly strong" vocals, and compared them to those of Gwen Stefani. Worldwide, the song performed weakly in official charts, peaking at number 76 in the United States and within the top 70 in Australia, Canada and Ireland. The music video for "Perfume" was directed by Joseph Kahn and released in December 2013. Spears' love interest in the video leaves her for another woman, while Spears is left devastated. Kahn mentioned that there is an unreleased director's cut version of the video, where Spears' role in the video is actually an assassin hired to kill her boyfriend. Spears included the song on her residency concert Britney: Piece of Me (2013–2016).

== Background and release ==
In July 2013, Spears revealed through Twitter that she "wrote such a special song" with Australian singer-songwriter Sia, which was later revealed to be Spears' favorite track on Britney Jean, the ballad "Perfume". In October 2013, it was announced that the song would serve as the second single for the album, after the release of lead single "Work Bitch" in September. RCA Records' CEO Peter Edge said he felt "fairly strong" that the song would be the second single after hearing it, and that it could be "a big career song". He continued to praise Spears' vocals, commenting that "she sings it beautifully and it has a real sincerity to it. And it's outstanding -- I think people are not only gonna be surprised but also see another side of Britney." Spears' manager Larry Rudolph described "Perfume" as being "a breakup song that's about wanting the next girl to smell your perfume on the guy afterwards. The lyric[s] [are] really unique and she sings the shit out of it."

On November 1, 2013, Spears tweeted that she would reveal previews of "Perfume" through her Snapchat account. Along with the lyrics "I want to believe / It's just you and me / Sometimes it feels like there's three of us in here, baby / So I wait for you to call and I try to act natural / Have you been thinking 'bout her or 'bout me / And while I wait, I put on my perfume / Yeah I want it all over you", the singer also shared the artwork for the single. The song was originally scheduled for release on November 5, 2013, along with the pre-order of Britney Jean. However, Spears made the song available for streaming via Facebook two days earlier on November 3, 2013 instead. It was then made available for purchase at midnight on November 4, 2013; one day ahead of the scheduled date. Following the release of "Perfume", she thanked her fans for "loving the song as she did". Record producer Dr. Luke revealed that the single release of the song is a "radio-friendly" edit, while the "rawer" and "less produced" original version would be included as a bonus track on the deluxe edition of Britney Jean.

== Composition ==
"Perfume"
A 21-second sample of the song's chorus features Spears singing over an instrumentation with infused synthesized voices, soaring strings and bubbling synthesizers. Lyrically, the song plays heavily on themes of jealousy and suspicion in a relationship.

"Perfume" is an '80s-influenced synthpop power ballad, which Spears described as "incredibly special to me because it hits close to home, and I think the story is relatable to everyone. Everyone's been through an insecure moment in a relationship that's left them vulnerable and I think this song captures that." Produced by will.i.am, Chris Braide, and Keith Harris, the instrumentation infuses an orchestral piano, soaring strings and bubbling synthesizers. Braide was responsible for the vocal production, and commented to Bradley Stern of MuuMuse: "When I was producing her vocals, it was obvious to me why she's still one of the greatest pop stars ever. Unmistakably Britney, effortlessly iconic." Lance Tolbert was responsible for the song's keys. Melodically, "Perfume" is written in the key of E♭ major, and is set in the common time with a moderately slow tempo of 80 beats per minute. The song follows the sequence of E♭ - A♭ - Cmin - B♭ as its chord progression, and Britney's voice spans from the low note of G_{3} to the high note of B♭_{4}.

Lyrically, the song plays heavily on themes of jealousy and suspicion in a relationship. The song starts with Spears singing, "Do I imagine it, or do I see your stare / Is there still longing there? / Oh I hate myself, and I feel crazy / Such a classic tale". Critics noted the singer's vocals are surprisingly strong, and compared them to those of Gwen Stefani. Regarding the lyrics, Amy Sciarretto of PopCrush wrote, "it's Brit's most lyrically weighty song in quite some time. In fact, this sounds like something we'd expect Kelly Clarkson or Carrie Underwood to record." Spears told the Associated Press the song was about her split with Jason Trawick in January 2013, and commented, "I think it will make girls not feel alone in this situation. When they're alone in their room and they broke up with their boyfriend, they have a song they can go to and listen to, just makes them feel better about themselves."

== Critical reception ==
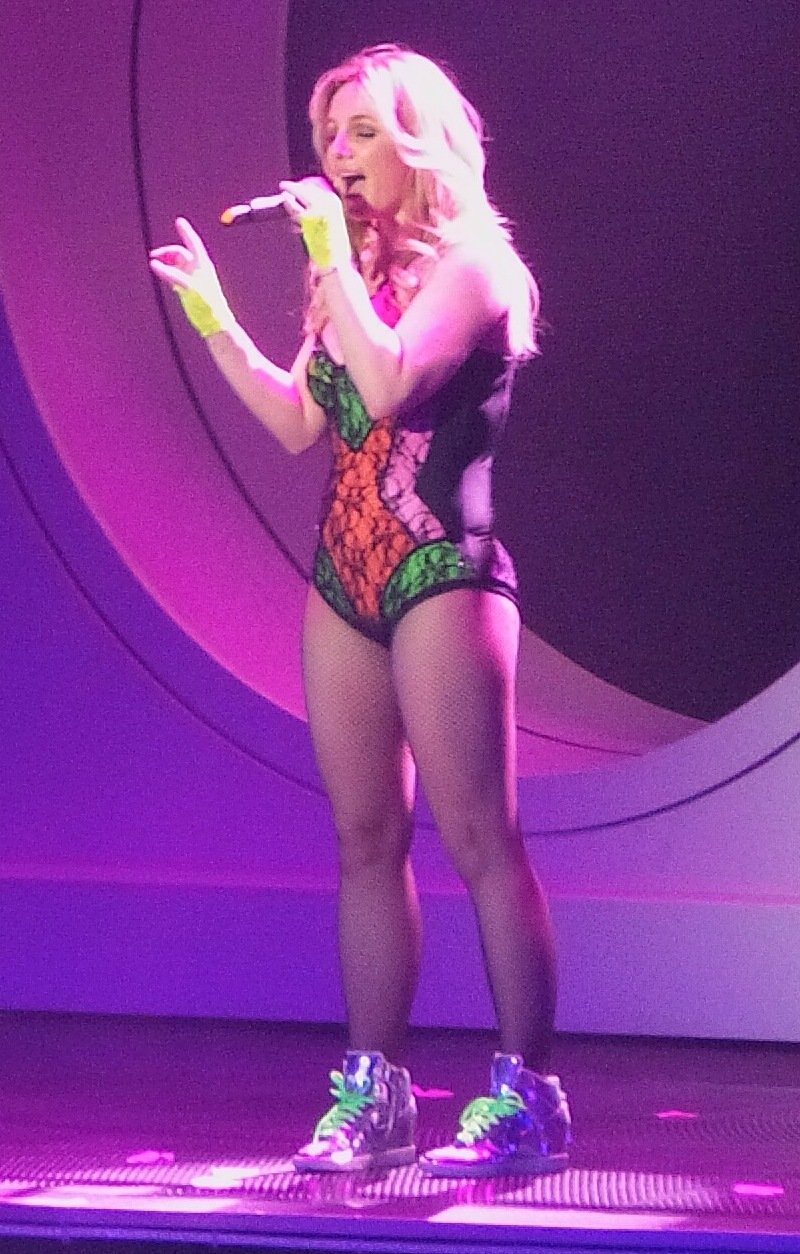
Spears performing "Perfume" during the Britney: Piece of Me residency in Las Vegas

Music critics noted the musical departure from its EDM-influenced predecessor, "Work Bitch" and praised Spears' vocal performance. Marc Hogan of Spin gave a generally positive review of "Perfume", complimenting Spears for conveying "the type of emotional vulnerability" that is not evident on most of her hit singles. Melinda Newman of HitFix lauded the song, stating Spears' vocal ability "is as strong as it has ever been" on the song and also stated it was Spears' "best song in years". Robbie Daw of Idolator praised the song's lyrical content, however stated it "wouldn't exactly reshape Top 40 radio". Jason Lipshutz of Billboard thought the song allowed Spears to momentarily discard the confident exterior of 'Work Bitch' and express vulnerability over 'paranoid' feelings about her romantic interest," while Katie Atkinson of Entertainment Weekly deemed the song "in the vein" of the singer's early ballads "Don't Let Me Be the Last to Know" (2000) and "Everytime" (2003). Joe Wilde of Contactmusic felt "Perfume" was similar to "Lucky" (2000), and deemed it "a much more delicate release" when compared to "Work Bitch".

Los Angeles Times journalist Mikael Wood noted that "Spears goes unexpectedly soft" on the song, adding that "she's pleading, not commanding. And that returns the star to the appealingly complicated zone of such tough/not-tough classics as 'Everytime' and 'Piece of Me'." A reviewer for Popjustice rated "Perfume" an 8 out of 10, and explained why he gave the song such rate: "1. The melody — it's a cracker. 2. The tempo — it's mid, but it's not boring. 3. The lyrics — they are quite touching if you've had a drink or two. And also well done Britney for: 4. The singing, which is very much on the right side of competent." New York Daily News contributor Jim Farber gave the song a mixed review, commenting that the song's production is "careful", and describing Spears as "pale" as she "overly ambitious [emotes]."

== Chart performance ==
"Perfume" debuted at number 76 on Billboard Hot 100 on November 13, 2013. On the Pop Songs chart, it debuted at number 37, reaching number 22 weeks later. In Europe, "Perfume" achieved weak success on the charts. In Austria, it debuted at number 69 on December 15, 2013. It re-appeared two weeks later, at number 73. On November 16, 2013, the song stayed for one week at number 41 on the Belgian Wallonia Singles Chart. The song debuted at its peak of number 34 on the French Singles Chart on November 16, 2013, before falling out of the chart. It re-appeared on December 7, at number 134, and fell off the chart again the week after, at number 186. "Perfume" experienced success on the Spanish Singles Chart, peaking at number 13 during the week of November 10, 2013. In Switzerland, it remained for one week, at number 74. In Italy, "Perfume" debuted at number 22 and fell off the chart the following week.

== Music video ==
The accompanying music video for "Perfume" was directed by Joseph Kahn, who previously directed Spears' music videos for "Stronger" (2000), "Toxic" (2004), and "Womanizer" (2008). Spears stated that she was "so stoked" to be working with him again, and that they had "a lot of success together & there is nobody I trust more with this super personal song". It was filmed on November 19–21, 2013, in the California desert, with production later being moved to Lancaster, California where scenes were shot at an old gas station. After production wrapped on the first day, Spears said, "So far SOOO good". Kahn said he was "blown away" by her performance. Spears herself also commented that she "had to dig deep and really play with some acting chops for this one". Four teasers were released until the official version of the video was uploaded to Vevo on December 10, 2013.

The scene of the video where Spears puts on some of her Fantasy brand perfume was criticized by a reviewer.

In the music video for "Perfume", Spears stars as the "other woman" of her lover. It begins with several scenes of Spears and her lover (played by Alexander Kjellevik) out of a motel and then on its roof drinking beer, inside a van, walking on the street, bathing in a pool, resting on a bed in her bra and panties and some hugs in the desert sunset. Spears gives him a crooked nail ring, symbolizing the simple love between them. After the first part, Spears is wearing lingerie inside a bathroom, putting on her Fantasy perfume and looking at the mirror, when an iPhone 5S sounds and displays Cindy's name. Spears then watches from a truck as her lover joins Cindy on a gas station in the desert. As Spears flees to a motel room to lament alone, her lover repeats the same activities with Cindy that he did with her – walking on the street, swimming in the pool, and drinking on the roof of a motel. At the end, her lover gives Cindy the crooked nail ring Spears once gave him, while she is still alone lamenting in the motel room and the video ends with the title "Perfume" on the screen.

Rachel McRady from Us Weekly noted that the video "is a bit more stripped down than Brit's fantastical iconic videos like "Oops! I Did It Again" and her new dance hit "Work B**ch."." Billboard's Chris Payne praised the director for staying true to the lyrical content, weaving a tale of jealousy and an ill-fated engagement ring along with the "contemplative" song. He finished the review saying "It's a video that captures the highs of a passionate relationship, but also plenty of the lows, which define it in the end.". Writing for MTV, Jocelyn Vena said that the video is probably one of Spears's most theatrical video in years.

=== Director's cut ===
On December 5, Kahn tweeted that the final version of the video is "extremely different" from the original edit, adding: "Don't get me wrong. Official cut is still cool, I think. [I] Just love my original edit". Following this, a Spears fan tweeted a link to a Petition urging RCA to release the director's cut; the petition's goal is to reach 1,000 signatures. Khan approved of the petition by re-tweeting it. Following the video's release, the director tweeted that his director's cut is a minute longer and had a very shocking ending, and called it "Breaking Badney". In an interview with VideoStatic, Khan mentioned the director's cut again, stating:

"It sucks, especially since my director's cut is an entirely different video. The released edit is missing half of the story and all of the editorial structure. [...] I guess people still like the video because of the gritty look which feels different, and the twist of the second girl in the second act. A narrative in two identical parts is still a solid idea even in compromised form. But it's such a faint reflection of the real narrative with broken execution and far less ambition. If they liked the weak version, I'd bet they'd love the strong one. No one knows what they're missing, and they're missing a lot".

On July 22, 2014, the original concept of the video was leaked. It begins with Spears meeting a guy with whom she falls instantly in love. It is made clear to the viewers that she is an assassin as she kills a group of people in a car. She is given her next assignment who turns out to be the guy she fell in love with. They go to meet in their favorite spot, but Spears is not there. She is across the street with a rifle with her target set on him. She looks through the scope and sees the man holding a ring he made for her. Spears aborts the mission and leaves town because she knows she will be killed for failing her assignment. Britney is found hiding out in a hotel by other assassins that beat and tie her to a chair. Time passes as the man dates a new girl, gets married, and has a baby. He looks out a window thinking about Spears. Then, she is seen on the floor of her hotel room, barely alive, as her body slowly turns to ash. The last shot of Spears is the hotel room is her smiling as their eyes seem to meet. Her body then disintegrates. The final scene of the video depicts Spears and the man kissing in the sunset. The authenticity of this concept for the video was confirmed by Kahn on Twitter except for the concept's ending, which he decided to change for the actual filming.

== Live performances ==
The song was performed for the first time during Spears' Las Vegas residency concert Britney: Piece of Me, which began on December 27, 2013. At the beginning of this performance, Spears told the crowd she wanted to "slow things down". She then sat on a stool and started singing the song. Keith Caulfield from Billboard commented that this performance "would seem that this is a performance that could easily be switched out for something else at a later date", as in the E! documentary I Am Britney Jean chronicling the show, Spears and her production team stated that the show's setlist could change over time. MTV's Sophie Schillaci elaborated that Spears offered a "heartfelt" rendition for the song, but pointed out that without dancing or pyrotechnics to distract, it was clear the sound was not different from the original version on the album. In August 2014, media speculated that Spears was lip-synching most to Sia's vocals than her ones during the performance. Following her break-up with her boyfriend David Lucado later that month, Spears temporarily removed the song from the setlist for a few shows in favor of "Alien". Spears continued to perform the song until the show's revamp in February 2016.

== Credits and personnel ==
Credits adapted from the liner notes of Britney Jean.

Recording

- Engineered at Guerrilla Studios, London
- Mixed at MixStar Studios, Virginia Beach, Virginia

Personnel

- Britney Spears – lead vocals, songwriting
- Sia – songwriting, backing vocals
- Chris Braide – songwriting, producer
- will.i.am – producer
- Keith Harris – producer

== Charts ==
=== Weekly charts ===
2013–2014 weekly chart performance
Chart	Peak position
Australia (ARIA)	61
Austria (Ö3 Austria Top 40)	69
Belgium (Ultratip Bubbling Under Flanders)	11
Belgium (Ultratop 50 Wallonia)	41
Brazil (Brasil Hot 100 Airplay)	82
Brazil (Brasil Hot Pop Songs)	31
Canada Hot 100 (Billboard)	70
Canada CHR/Top 40 (Billboard)	36
Canada Hot AC (Billboard)	50
CIS Airplay (TopHit)	142
France (SNEP)	34
Germany (GfK)	78
Greece Digital Songs (Billboard)	10
Ireland (IRMA)	36
Italy (FIMI)	22
Lebanon (Lebanese Top 20)	9
Netherlands (Single Top 100)	100
South Korea International Singles (Gaon)	6
Spain (Promusicae)	13
Switzerland (Schweizer Hitparade)	74
Ukraine Airplay (TopHit)	81
US Billboard Hot 100	76
US Pop Airplay (Billboard)	22

=== Monthly charts ===
2013 monthly chart performance
Chart	Peak position
Ukraine Airplay (TopHit)	91

== Release history ==
Release dates and formats
Region	Date	Format(s)	Label(s)	Ref.
Italy	October 22, 2013	Contemporary hit radio	Sony	
Various	November 3, 2013	Streaming	RCA	
Various	November 4, 2013	Digital download	RCA	(Note: attributed to digital platforms in Belgium, Canada, France, Germany, Ireland, Italy, the Netherlands, New Zealand, Norway, Spain, Sweden, Switzerland, and the United States)
United States	November 12, 2013	Contemporary hit radio	RCA	
United Kingdom	January 26, 2014	Digital download	RCA	
