= Pedro Cazanova =

Portuguese disc jockey and record producer

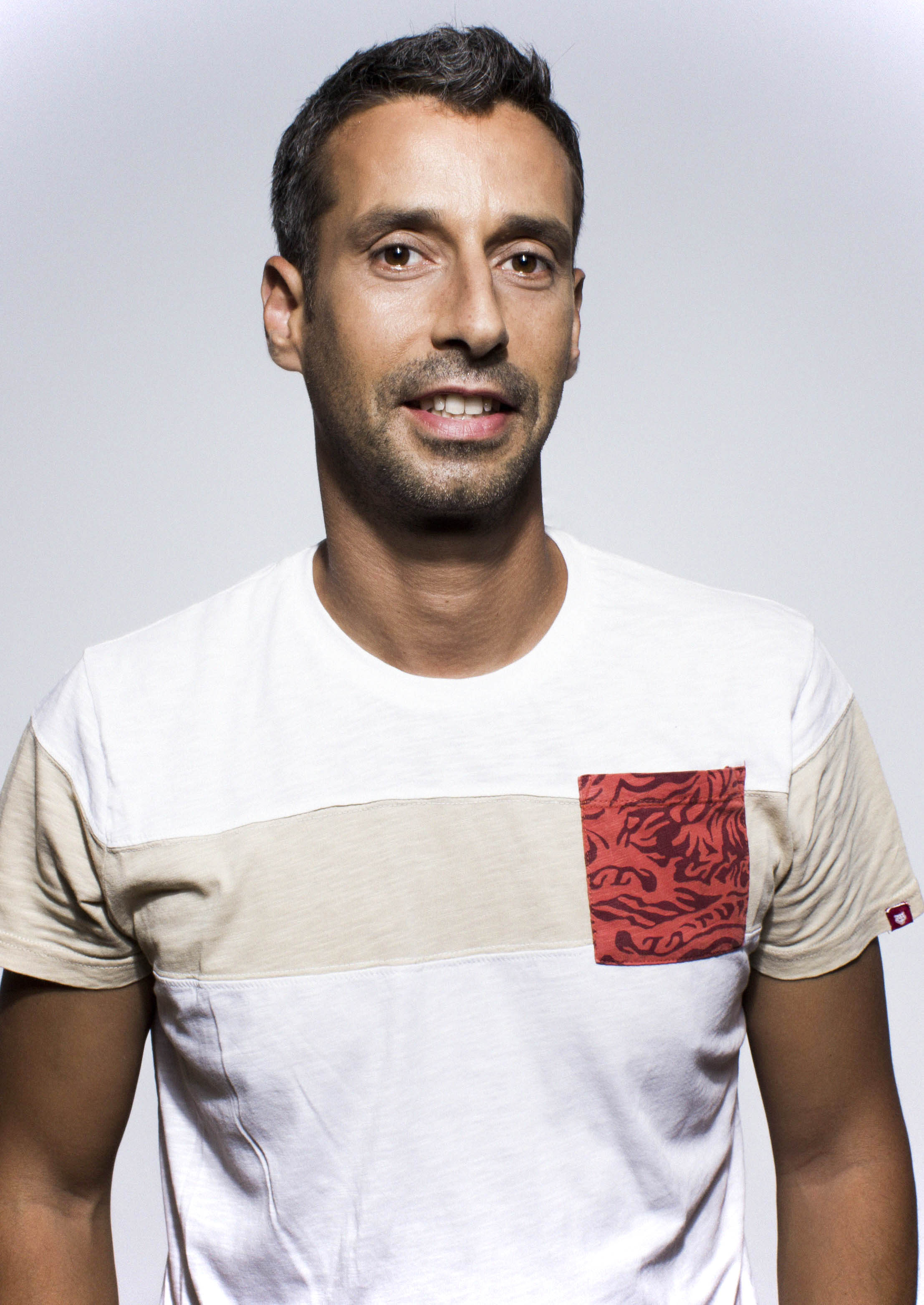
- Cazanova in 2015

Background information
- Birth name: Pedro Penedo
- Also known as: Pedro Cazanova
- Born: May 16, 1977; Lisbon, Portugal
- Genres: Dance; EDM; house
- Occupations: DJ; producer; remixer
- Labels: Symphonik Records
- Website: http://pedrocazanova.com

Pedro Penedo (born 16 May 1977), better known as Pedro Cazanova, is a Portuguese house music disc jockey and record producer.

Born in Lisbon, Pedro Cazanova achieved mainstream success with his #1 single "Selfish Love" in 2009 and #9 single "My First Luv" in 2010 in Portugal.

He founded the label Symphonik Records in 2013. In 2014 he released his first album "Pedro Cazanova", containing the single "Loose Control".

== See also ==
- Anthony Preston (record producer)
