= Britney: Piece of Me =

2013–2017 concert residency by Britney Spears

- Residency by Britney Spears
- Location: Paradise, Nevada, U.S.
- Venue: The AXIS at Planet Hollywood Resort & Casino
- Start date: December 27, 2013
- End date: December 31, 2017
- No. of shows: 248
- Attendance: 916,184
- Box office: US$137.7 million (Note: US$180.86 million in 2025 dollars.)
- Website: Official website

Britney Spears concert chronology
- Femme Fatale Tour (2011); Britney: Piece of Me (2013–2017); Britney: Live in Concert (2017)

Britney: Piece of Me was the first concert residency by American entertainer Britney Spears, performed at The AXIS auditorium located in the Planet Hollywood Resort & Casino on the Las Vegas Strip in Paradise, Nevada. The show, which opened on December 27, 2013, was initially set for two years; it was well received by critics and also achieved huge commercial success. The residency won the best of Las Vegas award in 2015 and 2017. In 2015, Spears extended her contract with Planet Hollywood for an additional two years, concluding the residency on December 31, 2017. After 248 performances, the show grossed $137.7 million from 916,184 tickets at an average price of $150.

Following the success of the residency, the show was adapted to debut internationally as an arena concert tour, in both 2017 and 2018, credited as Britney: Live in Concert and the Piece of Me Tour, respectively.

== Background and announcement ==
After completing the Femme Fatale Tour in December 2011, rumors circulated of Spears performing at a concert residency in Las Vegas. It was initially believed Spears would be added to the roster for The Colosseum at Caesars Palace. In February 2013, it was reported that Planet Hollywood theatre was a front runner to host the show. It was also believed the newly remodeled SLS Las Vegas, placed a venue bid as well. Las Vegas Sun confirmed in May 2013 that the venue was under renovations exclusively for Spears's show. The article speculated the residency would be announced in June 2013. Spears would begin rehearsals in autumn 2013 for the show. Spears herself hinted at the residency during her interview with Shape, in May 2013. She stated, "The [Vegas] performances won't be simple—they'll be a massive party from start to finish. And to pull this off, I have to be in top condition and running at full speed".

The residency was confirmed on September 17, 2013, with an announcement on Good Morning America. For the announcement, an elaborate stunt was staged in the desert surrounding Las Vegas which cost over $100,000 to produce. Over 1,000 Spears fans were gathered to perform a card routine that reportedly could be seen from space. Spears arrived via helicopter and gave an interview to Good Morning America. Spears's manager, Larry Rudolph, stated the show was not comparable to previous or current Las Vegas stints. He went on to say the show would focus on Spears's new material and not rely on her back catalogue. She was reportedly earning $15 million per year.

On September 25, 2014, Spears confirmed on Good Morning Britain that she had extended her contract with The AXIS and Planet Hollywood to continue the show for two additional years. On August 16, 2015, Spears told E! at the 2015 Teen Choice Awards that she had not yet made up her mind on whether or not she would extend her residency further. She said, "I'm not really sure. [...] I haven't made up my mind. I really love doing the show. It's a lot, a lot of fun but I'm kind of torn right now. I don't really know what I want to do."

During her show on September 9, 2015, Spears confirmed that she would be extending her residency for an additional two years. She also revealed that the show would be revamped, with major changes in both the set list and choreography.

== Development ==
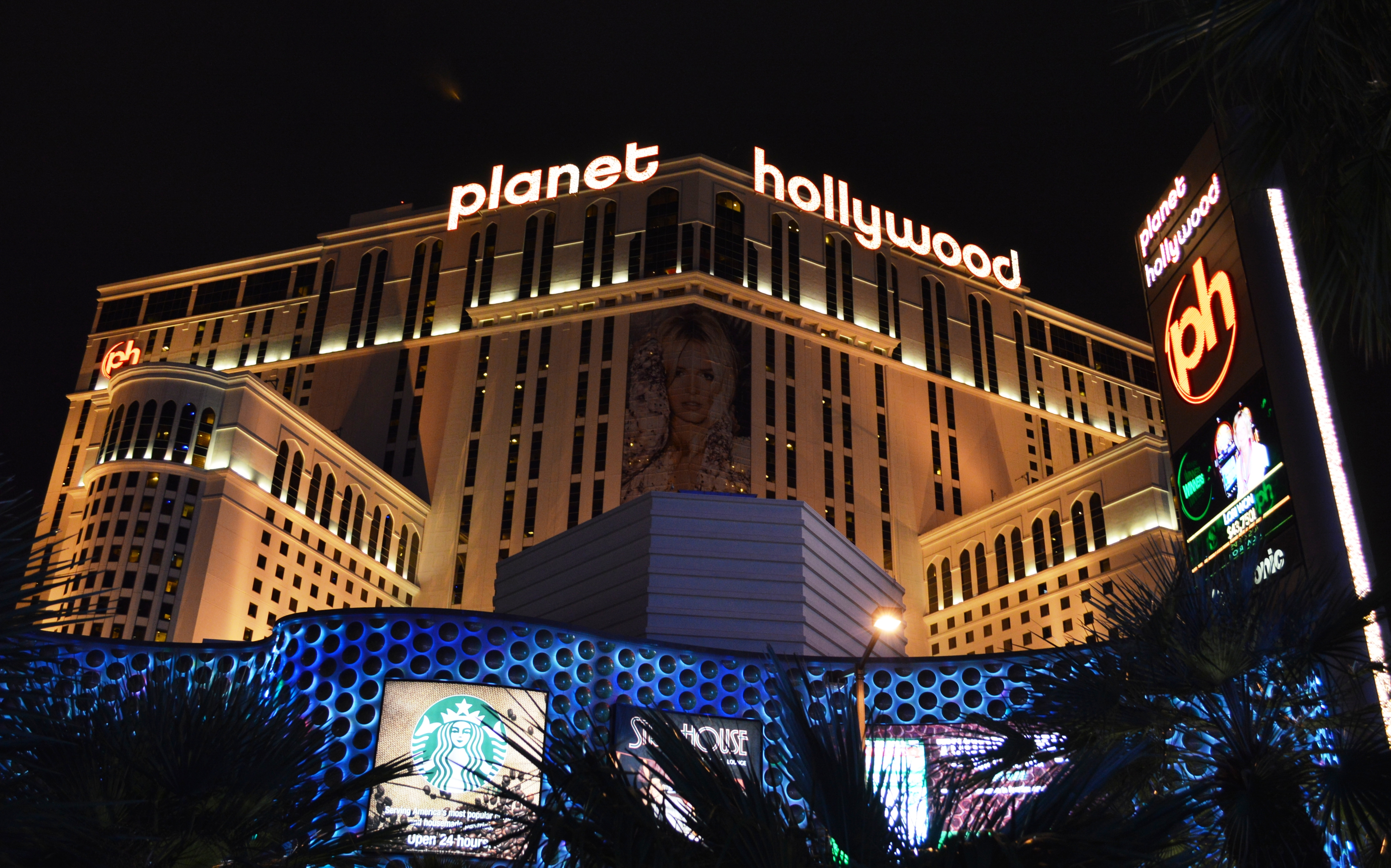
Planet Hollywood Resort & Casino, where Spears used to headline at The AXIS theater

The show is described to be "current" and have a "club-like atmosphere" to match the vibe of the casino. The venue closed in late October 2012 to undergo a $20 million renovation with lighting, sound and stage to accommodate the show. The stage was extended, reducing the venue capacity to 4,600. The show began on December 27, 2013, following the release of her eighth studio album, Britney Jean. Tickets for the show went on sale September 20, 2013, with prices ranging from $59–$179, less than the typical $99–$250 for shows at Caesars Palace. Commenting on show, Spears stated:

"We wanted the environment to be that way so people could come and have a good time and stand up and feel like they're in the show with me. I love Vegas. The energy here is really, really good. [...] We are going to have all the works now, water, rain, everything. Every time I do a show, I like to really bring it. I love to put on a show that will really entertain fans. [...] We want the feeling that fans will be in the show with me. We're going to have a cool set-up for them with a party vibe so they are really there with me. I'm very ready for this. I'm ready physically, mentally definitely. The show will be completely different from what everybody might be expecting. It's the best project I've ever tackled. It couldn't be more exciting.

Baz Halpin serves as creative and stage director for the show. Marco Morante is the costume designer. The show runs 90–100 minutes, featuring 24 of Spears's hits. The set features a 360-degree media wall, creating the illusion similar to a planetarium. One of the sets incorporates several venus flytraps and another adopts a disco theme. It also features 14 dancers and a four-piece band composed of Marc Delcore (Musical Director-Keyboards), Greg Delcore (Bass), Ernest LaRouche (Drums), Zach Comtois (Guitar). Seating for the theatre is reduced to 4,600 specifically for the show. The theatre features two dance areas, table-service seating and the stage features a runway shaped like an inverted anchor. Rudolph stated Spears will not be miming the show and that Spears is undergoing vocal coaching to strengthen her voice, adding, "There might be some numbers where she's full out dancing with a track underneath her, but there won't be any lip-syncing across the board on anything". Days after tickets went on sales, figures were reported to be dismal, as only three of the 16 shows placed on sale were sold out. Many pointed to lip-syncing as the main issue. Spears's manager indicated Caesars Entertainment only placed ten-percent of tickets for each show on sale. He also stated VIP seating for all 16 shows were sold out within hours. The Huffington Post reported that by September 25, 70,242 out of 73,600 tickets had been sold.

== Concert synopsis ==
The show begins with a video of a young Spears dancing throughout her childhood home in Louisiana, dreaming of being a performer one day. In a flashback montage, clips of Spears's past performances are displayed. As this comes to an end, the curtains draw open and Spears and her dancers kick off the show with "Work Bitch". For this performance, Spears enters the stage in a globe-like cage from above. The show continues with a performance of "Womanizer". After this, Spears formally welcomes her audience to the show. She then asks the audience to count to three with her, leading into a performance of "3" and concluding the first segment of the show.

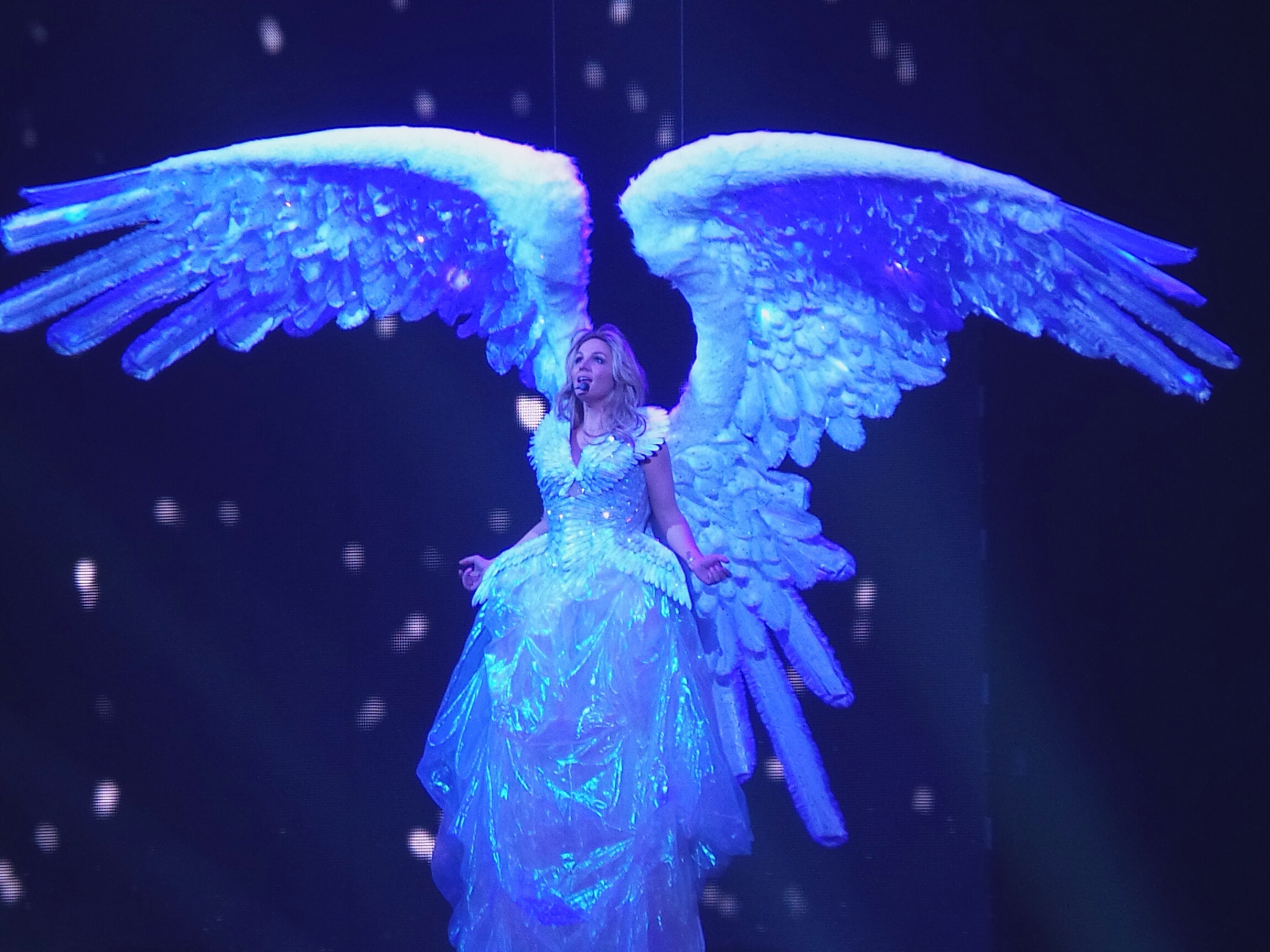
Spears performing "Everytime" at the show

The next segment of the show began with a clip of Spears dressed as an angel, reading a poem to the audience. Spears then enters the stage harnessed in the air and dressed in angel wings, leading into a performance of "Everytime". During this performance, white flowers and petals resembling snow fall on the stage. Following this, the dancers join Spears, who is dressed in a black leotard, for a medley of "...Baby One More Time" and "Oops!... I Did It Again", with a dance break and rope routine integrated into the segment.

Following this, another montage begins to play, featuring a mixture of Spears's videos throughout her career. This is followed by a performance of "Me Against the Music", where the wooden stage props and choreography are reminiscent of the original music video. After this, a medley of songs from Blackout begins, with performances of "Gimme More" and "Break the Ice". The medley then incorporates the song "Piece of Me" after a dance break, where Britney tries to escape her dancers, who are imitating the paparazzi throughout.

The next video interlude incorporates the song "Scream & Shout" and features will.i.am. Spears then goes on to perform "Boys" and, after a short speech to the audience, "Perfume".

"Get Naked (I Got a Plan)" (Interlude) introduces the fifth segment. It starts with Spears dancing on a pole to "I'm a Slave 4 U", surrounded by her female dancers that are playing in a fountain. In the earlier shows, Spears sat on a throne surrounded by her female dancers, instead of the pole routine that was seen on later dates. After this, Spears performs "Freakshow", while she and her female dancers search for a "victim" willing to participate from the audience. Notable participants in this segment have been Nicole Richie, AJ McLean, Mario Lopez, Kathy Griffin, Tyson Beckford, Perez Hilton, Lance Bass, Dolph Ziggler, and Adore Delano. In this performance, Spears walks the participant while they wear a leash and spanks them with a whip, creating a BDSM scenario. After the song, she signs a T-shirt for the fan and thanks them for participating. Spears then performs "Do Somethin'", where she and her male dancers perform choreography with chairs.

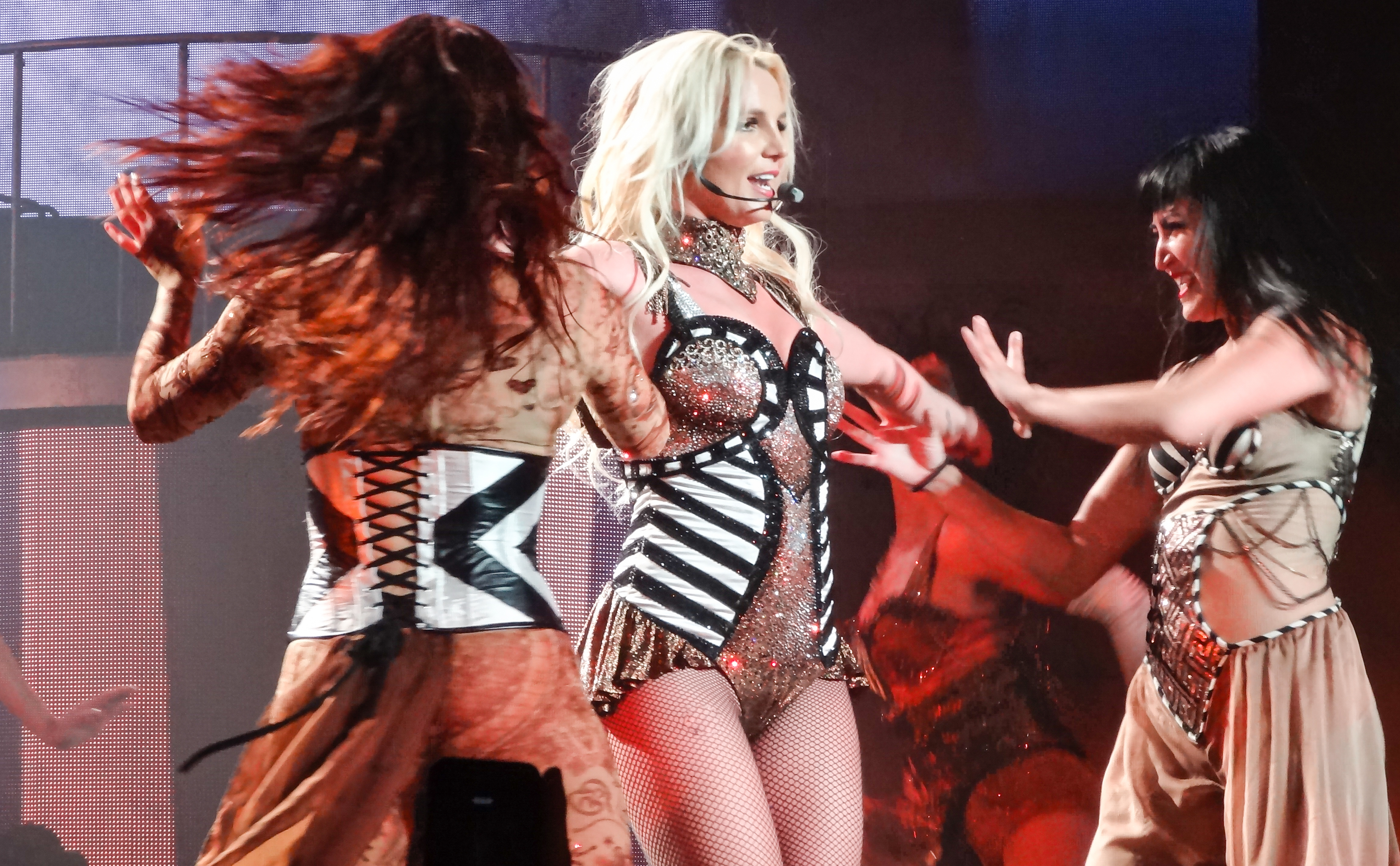
Spears performing "Circus" at Piece of Me

The next interlude includes circus-themed music and performances by her backup dancers. Spears enters the stage in a large ring of fire, where she begins her performance of "Circus". She then performs "I Wanna Go", which includes the use of a variety of mirrors. A slowed down remix of "Lucky" is then performed, in which Spears sits on a circus-themed prop.

The next stage intro includes jungle-themed elements and a wood and flower themed video-screen. A large tree appears on stage with Spears standing on it. She is surrounded by rain dropping from the stage ceiling. Spears then performs a slowed-down version of "Toxic" before jumping from the tree and momentarily flying above her audience. At this point, the original version of "Toxic" begins. After this, Spears performs "Stronger", and then "(You Drive Me) Crazy". During "Crazy", Spears asks the audience to thank her band and dancers. She then begins the final performance of "Till the World Ends", which features elements of "Work Bitch".

At the end of the show, Spears thanks the audience and exits the stage through the globe-like cage in which she entered. As the screens of the stage close, Spears's dancers exit the stage, while a display of fireworks concludes the show.

On February 13, 2016, Spears debuted a newly revamped show. The updated show includes a new entrance during "Work Bitch", as well as performances of songs including "I Love Rock 'n' Roll", "Breathe on Me", "Touch of My Hand", and "If U Seek Amy". Further, a variety of updates to performances of existing songs from the set list were also made, including a new dance break during "Womanizer" and changes to the original performance of "Break the Ice". Spears also included a new dance segment in the show in which she and her dancers dance to three of her favorite Missy Elliott songs. In August 2016, the set list was updated once more in anticipation of the release of Spears's ninth studio album, Glory.

== Critical reception ==
The show was met with mostly positive reviews and became a commercial success since its opening. According to Danielle Genet of ABC News, the opening show "drew rave reviews [...] for Spears' lavish, entertaining spectacle." MTV News contributor Sophie Schillaci wrote that "Spears delivered on her signature style of larger-than-life production, blaring beats and rapid-fire dance moves, whirling through seven costume changes and even a couple of wig changes." Schillaci also commented that long-time fans would appreciate the concert as it is "more of a look backwards than forwards," and added that, while Spears may not sing completely live, "[the singer's] sweet voice shone through the backing, or we could hear her catching her breath between numbers." She concluded her review saying that "if you're looking for a powerhouse vocal performance in your Vegas entertainment, head over to The Colosseum for Celine Dion. But Britney fans will find no better show on the strip than 'Piece of Me'." Marco della Cava of USA Today praised the concert, saying that Spears's mission "to turn a cavernous 7,000-seat amphitheater into a raging nightclub" was accomplished. Cava considered it a stand-out compared to other Las Vegas residencies "because of its production values." Jennifer Whitehair of Vegas.com said the show became the top-searched topic on the website.

Mikael Wood of the Los Angeles Times commented on Spears's singing, writing that "the singer appeared to be lip-syncing for the majority of her performance"; however, he added that the production "has plenty to distract you from the vocal question." Wood also thought that, while "'Piece of Me' hits most of the high points in Spears' songbook," songs like "Boys", "3", and "Do Somethin'" could "have been replaced with superior cuts from her recent albums." Writing for Billboard, Keith Caulfield noted that "vast majority of the show was lip-synced, and only occasionally were any seemingly live vocals heard." The reviewer praised the use of live instrumentation from the four-piece band, on songs such as "Me Against the Music". Rachel Maresca of New York Daily News noted that Spears "wowed the crowd" on the opening night, and added that the singer "pulled out all the stops to entertain her fans with plenty of theatrics on stage. She even gave the audience a taste of nostalgia by donning some her famous outfits from her most memorable past performances." Laura Hertzfeld of Entertainment Weekly revealed that "[she'd] have loved to have seen more" of the concert as "it was the most connected to [Spears] as an artist that one can feel from the audience."

Las Vegas Sun journalist Robin Leach said that Spears "proved that she's still reigning royalty in the music world" with the residency, adding that the show is "an amazing and incredible accomplishment because in less than two hours, Britney changed the look of our Strip entertainment scene. For the first time, she single-handedly brought the spectacle of a touring arena show into a nightclub-like theater and pulled off the gamble with a flawless performance." Leach lauded the singer's physique, stating that "she hasn't looked this hot in ages and certainly doesn't need cosmetic makeup for her body, as critics claim." Caryn Ganz of Rolling Stone wrote a mixed review, saying that, "viewed through a lens of diminished expectations [...]), Britney: Piece of Me is an entertaining tour through the 32-year-old star's nearly 15-year recording career. Compared to pop spectacles staged by Madonna and Beyoncé [...], however, the weaknesses that remain in Spears' live act are stark." Ganz was unimpressed by Spears's dancing abilities, saying that the singer was "reliant on arm movements." The reviewer wrote, however, that "the show featured flashes of greatness," with the performances of "Work Bitch", "...Baby One More Time", "(You Drive Me) Crazy", "Circus" and "Everytime" being the stand outs.

In 2015, the revamped show received a cautious endorsement by Julie Bone of The Washington Post: "If you're even vaguely interested in pop music, dance and the art of performance, see 'Piece of Me.'" Bone praised the choreography and made-over playlist, which "wisely buries the last vestiges of the '90s pop princess's Mouseketeer roots." But the experience still feels hollow and detached, that review noted, considering fans' obvious devotion. Bob Sehlinger expressed harsh criticism on Spears "over-processed" live vocals and "poor" showmanship on The Unofficial Guide to Las Vegas 2017, claiming that "Spears doesn't seem to have maturated much as a performer, and never reveals a glimpse of her personality."

== Recognition ==
The success of the show highlighted a shift in both the culture and demographics of the Las Vegas strip after its opening in December 2013. Spears has since been credited as having played a vital role in the expansion of nightlife and attraction of younger crowds to the city. It was also reported that the residency brought an additional $20 million in annual earnings for Planet Hollywood, allowing it to revitalize the property in terms of both finances and popularity. As of June 2017, the show had grossed over $100 million, not including merchandise or remaining shows.

In 2014, Caesars Entertainment honored Spears with her own holiday, announcing that November 5 would officially be known as "Britney Day". On November 5, 2014, a special ceremony was held in honor of Spears at The Linq Promenade, where she was presented with a Key to the City of Las Vegas by Clark County Commissioner Steve Sisolak and Planet Hollywood regional president David Hoenemeyer.

Since the show's debut, other major performers, such as Jennifer Lopez, Pitbull, the Backstreet Boys, Mariah Carey and Lady Gaga, have followed in Spears's footsteps and accepted residency offers as well. Like Spears, Lopez also headlined at The AXIS, but for a shorter period of time. Rascal Flatts manager Clarence Spalding says Spears' residency helped inspire his act's 2015 mini-residency at Hard Rock Hotel & Casino's Joint venue.

== Commercial performance ==
The show, which features many of Spears's hit songs, was named "Best of Las Vegas" in 2015 and 2017. After completing the original run of the show, Spears revealed that the extension would feature updates to the set list, choreography and costumes. The revamped show opened on February 13, 2016. Spears also revealed that there would be more changes incorporated into the show throughout the year. On April 7, 2017, Spears's manager Larry Rudolph announced that the Britney: Piece of Me residency at The Axis Theatre at Planet Hollywood Resort & Casino in Las Vegas would end on December 31, 2017, with the expiration of her contract with Caesars Entertainment.

In February 2017, Billboard reported that ticket sales from the show topped $100 million and more than 700,000 tickets were sold, making it one of the most successful concert residencies in Las Vegas, only behind Celine Dion and Elton John. According to Pollstar, the 58 dates in 2014 grossed $35.1 million with 231,713 tickets and averaged $151.48 per ticket price. In 2017, it was ranked the 2nd highest-grossing female show of the year in North America with a total gross of $38.9 million and 238,144 tickets sold and averaged $163.20 per ticket. The last show of the residency on December 31, 2017, broke the record for the highest-grossing single concert in a theater residency ever in Las Vegas. It grossed nearly $1.2 million for 4,600 fans and $255 average ticket price. Overall, Britney: Piece of Me grossed $137,695,392 with 916,184 tickets sold in 248 shows, according to Caesars Entertainment.

== Broadcasts ==
On May 17, 2015, Spears performed her single "Pretty Girls" with Iggy Azalea for the 2015 Billboard Music Awards from her residency stage. In August 2016, following the release of her ninth studio album Glory, Spears performed two songs from the album, "Make Me" without G-Eazy and "Do You Wanna Come Over?", for Today.

On December 21, 2017, Spears announced on her social media platforms that she would be broadcasting a special performance from The AXIS Theatre at Planet Hollywood on Dick Clark's New Year's Rockin' Eve '18 with Ryan Seacrest. Her performance of "Work Bitch" aired on December 31, 2017 and her performance of "Toxic" aired on January 1, 2018 shortly after the New Years countdown in the Eastern Time Zone.

== Set list ==
=== December 2013 to January 2016 ===
This set list is from the concert on December 27, 2013.

1. "Work Bitch"
2. "Womanizer"
3. "3"
4. "Everytime"
5. "...Baby One More Time"
6. "Oops!... I Did It Again"
7. "Me Against the Music"
8. "Gimme More"
9. "Break the Ice"
10. "Piece of Me"
11. "Boys"
12. "Perfume"
13. "I'm a Slave 4 U"
14. "Freakshow"
15. "Do Somethin'"
16. "Circus"
17. "I Wanna Go"
18. "Lucky"
19. "Toxic"
20. "Stronger"
21. "(You Drive Me) Crazy"

Encore

22. "Till the World Ends"

=== February 2016 to December 2017 ===
This set list is from the concert on February 13, 2016.

1. "Work Bitch"
2. "Womanizer"
3. "Break the Ice"
4. "Piece of Me"
5. "Me Against the Music"
6. "I Love Rock 'n' Roll"
7. "Gimme More"
8. "Everytime"
9. "...Baby One More Time"
10. "Oops!... I Did It Again"
11. "Boys"
12. "Pretty Girls"
13. "I'm a Slave 4 U"
14. "Freakshow"
15. "Do Somethin'"
16. "Circus"
17. "If U Seek Amy"
18. "Breathe on Me"
19. "Touch of My Hand"
20. "Toxic"
21. "Stronger"
22. "(You Drive Me) Crazy"

Encore

23. "Till the World Ends"

=== Alterations ===
- "Alien" was performed during select shows throughout 2014 in place of either "Do Somethin'" or "Perfume".
- "Pretty Girls" was first performed on August 5, 2015, permanently replacing "I Wanna Go".
- "Make Me" and "Do You Wanna Come Over?" were added to the set list, beginning on August 17, 2016, permanently replacing "Pretty Girls".
- On October 21, 2016, G-Eazy was a special guest performing "Make Me". The two then performed "Me, Myself & I" live for the first time on the Piece of Me stage.
- "Slumber Party" was added to the set list on November 16, 2016. Also, "Change Your Mind (No Seas Cortes)" replaced "Radar" as the song used in the first interlude.
- On January 25, 2017, Tinashe was a special guest, performing "Slumber Party".
- On August 19, 2017, Spears performed a live vocal cover of Bonnie Raitt's "Something to Talk About" as a response to lip sync accusations at her residency following addressing the same accusations overseas during her Britney: Live in Concert shows back in June 2017.

== Shows ==
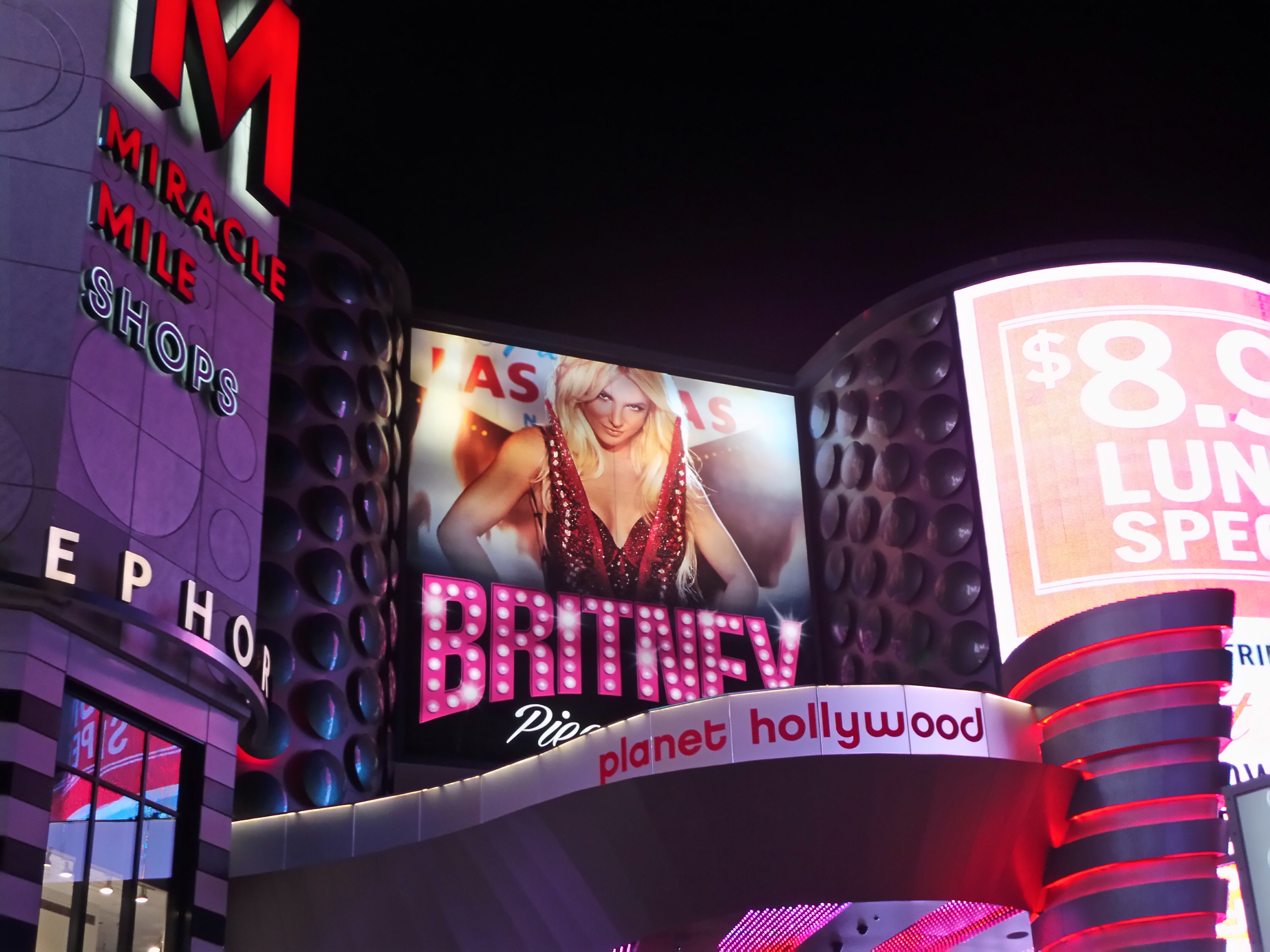
The AXIS, the venue of the residency, is located at the Planet Hollywood Resort & Casino (pictured).

Date	Attendance	Revenue
Leg 1
December 27, 2013	17,813 / 17,813 (100%)	$2,858,180
December 28, 2013	17,813 / 17,813 (100%)	$2,858,180
December 30, 2013	17,813 / 17,813 (100%)	$2,858,180
December 31, 2013	17,813 / 17,813 (100%)	$2,858,180
Leg 2
January 29, 2014	53,798 / 53,798 (100%)	$8,011,280
January 31, 2014	53,798 / 53,798 (100%)	$8,011,280
February 1, 2014	53,798 / 53,798 (100%)	$8,011,280
February 4, 2014	53,798 / 53,798 (100%)	$8,011,280
February 7, 2014	53,798 / 53,798 (100%)	$8,011,280
February 8, 2014	53,798 / 53,798 (100%)	$8,011,280
February 12, 2014	53,798 / 53,798 (100%)	$8,011,280
February 14, 2014	53,798 / 53,798 (100%)	$8,011,280
February 15, 2014	53,798 / 53,798 (100%)	$8,011,280
February 18, 2014	53,798 / 53,798 (100%)	$8,011,280
February 19, 2014	53,798 / 53,798 (100%)	$8,011,280
February 22, 2014	53,798 / 53,798 (100%)	$8,011,280
Leg 3
April 25, 2014	48,901 / 49,290 (99%)	$7,850,813
April 26, 2014	48,901 / 49,290 (99%)	$7,850,813
April 30, 2014	48,901 / 49,290 (99%)	$7,850,813
May 2, 2014	48,901 / 49,290 (99%)	$7,850,813
May 3, 2014	48,901 / 49,290 (99%)	$7,850,813
May 7, 2014	48,901 / 49,290 (99%)	$7,850,813
May 9, 2014	48,901 / 49,290 (99%)	$7,850,813
May 10, 2014	48,901 / 49,290 (99%)	$7,850,813
May 14, 2014	48,901 / 49,290 (99%)	$7,850,813
May 16, 2014	48,901 / 49,290 (99%)	$7,850,813
May 17, 2014	48,901 / 49,290 (99%)	$7,850,813
Leg 4
August 15, 2014	59,262 / 63,753 (93%)	$8,757,082
August 16, 2014	59,262 / 63,753 (93%)	$8,757,082
August 19, 2014	59,262 / 63,753 (93%)	$8,757,082
August 20, 2014	59,262 / 63,753 (93%)	$8,757,082
August 23, 2014	59,262 / 63,753 (93%)	$8,757,082
August 24, 2014	59,262 / 63,753 (93%)	$8,757,082
August 27, 2014	59,262 / 63,753 (93%)	$8,757,082
August 28, 2014	59,262 / 63,753 (93%)	$8,757,082
August 30, 2014	59,262 / 63,753 (93%)	$8,757,082
August 31, 2014	59,262 / 63,753 (93%)	$8,757,082
September 3, 2014	59,262 / 63,753 (93%)	$8,757,082
September 5, 2014	59,262 / 63,753 (93%)	$8,757,082
September 6, 2014	59,262 / 63,753 (93%)	$8,757,082
September 10, 2014	59,262 / 63,753 (93%)	$8,757,082
Leg 5
October 3, 2014	55,617 / 77,443 (72%)	$8,327,249
October 4, 2014	55,617 / 77,443 (72%)	$8,327,249
October 8, 2014	55,617 / 77,443 (72%)	$8,327,249
October 10, 2014	55,617 / 77,443 (72%)	$8,327,249
October 11, 2014	55,617 / 77,443 (72%)	$8,327,249
October 15, 2014	55,617 / 77,443 (72%)	$8,327,249
October 17, 2014	55,617 / 77,443 (72%)	$8,327,249
October 18, 2014	55,617 / 77,443 (72%)	$8,327,249
October 22, 2014	55,617 / 77,443 (72%)	$8,327,249
October 24, 2014	55,617 / 77,443 (72%)	$8,327,249
October 25, 2014	55,617 / 77,443 (72%)	$8,327,249
October 29, 2014	55,617 / 77,443 (72%)	$8,327,249
October 31, 2014	55,617 / 77,443 (72%)	$8,327,249
November 1, 2014	55,617 / 77,443 (72%)	$8,327,249
November 5, 2014	55,617 / 77,443 (72%)	$8,327,249
November 7, 2014	55,617 / 77,443 (72%)	$8,327,249
November 8, 2014	55,617 / 77,443 (72%)	$8,327,249
Leg 6
December 27, 2014	16,895 / 18,221 (93%)	$2,799,641
December 28, 2014	16,895 / 18,221 (93%)	$2,799,641
December 30, 2014	16,895 / 18,221 (93%)	$2,799,641
December 31, 2014	16,895 / 18,221 (93%)	$2,799,641
Leg 7
January 28, 2015	58,001 / 80,189 (72%)	$8,134,492
January 30, 2015	58,001 / 80,189 (72%)	$8,134,492
January 31, 2015	58,001 / 80,189 (72%)	$8,134,492
February 4, 2015	58,001 / 80,189 (72%)	$8,134,492
February 6, 2015	58,001 / 80,189 (72%)	$8,134,492
February 7, 2015	58,001 / 80,189 (72%)	$8,134,492
February 11, 2015	58,001 / 80,189 (72%)	$8,134,492
February 13, 2015	58,001 / 80,189 (72%)	$8,134,492
February 14, 2015	58,001 / 80,189 (72%)	$8,134,492
February 17, 2015	58,001 / 80,189 (72%)	$8,134,492
February 18, 2015	58,001 / 80,189 (72%)	$8,134,492
February 20, 2015	58,001 / 80,189 (72%)	$8,134,492
February 21, 2015	58,001 / 80,189 (72%)	$8,134,492
February 25, 2015	58,001 / 80,189 (72%)	$8,134,492
February 27, 2015	58,001 / 80,189 (72%)	$8,134,492
February 28, 2015	58,001 / 80,189 (72%)	$8,134,492
March 4, 2015	58,001 / 80,189 (72%)	$8,134,492
March 6, 2015	58,001 / 80,189 (72%)	$8,134,492
March 7, 2015	58,001 / 80,189 (72%)	$8,134,492
Leg 8
April 15, 2015	44,896 / 54,791 (82%)	$5,965,614
April 17, 2015	44,896 / 54,791 (82%)	$5,965,614
April 18, 2015	44,896 / 54,791 (82%)	$5,965,614
April 22, 2015	44,896 / 54,791 (82%)	$5,965,614
April 24, 2015	44,896 / 54,791 (82%)	$5,965,614
April 25, 2015	44,896 / 54,791 (82%)	$5,965,614
April 29, 2015	44,896 / 54,791 (82%)	$5,965,614
May 8, 2015	44,896 / 54,791 (82%)	$5,965,614
May 10, 2015	44,896 / 54,791 (82%)	$5,965,614
May 13, 2015	44,896 / 54,791 (82%)	$5,965,614
May 15, 2015	44,896 / 54,791 (82%)	$5,965,614
May 16, 2015	44,896 / 54,791 (82%)	$5,965,614
May 20, 2015	44,896 / 54,791 (82%)	$5,965,614
Leg 9
August 5, 2015	56,154 / 72,112 (78%)	$7,759,337
August 7, 2015	56,154 / 72,112 (78%)	$7,759,337
August 8, 2015	56,154 / 72,112 (78%)	$7,759,337
August 12, 2015	56,154 / 72,112 (78%)	$7,759,337
August 14, 2015	56,154 / 72,112 (78%)	$7,759,337
August 15, 2015	56,154 / 72,112 (78%)	$7,759,337
August 18, 2015	56,154 / 72,112 (78%)	$7,759,337
August 19, 2015	56,154 / 72,112 (78%)	$7,759,337
August 21, 2015	56,154 / 72,112 (78%)	$7,759,337
August 22, 2015	56,154 / 72,112 (78%)	$7,759,337
August 26, 2015	56,154 / 72,112 (78%)	$7,759,337
August 28, 2015	56,154 / 72,112 (78%)	$7,759,337
August 29, 2015	56,154 / 72,112 (78%)	$7,759,337
September 2, 2015	56,154 / 72,112 (78%)	$7,759,337
September 4, 2015	56,154 / 72,112 (78%)	$7,759,337
September 5, 2015	56,154 / 72,112 (78%)	$7,759,337
September 9, 2015	56,154 / 72,112 (78%)	$7,759,337
Leg 10
October 14, 2015	55,705 / 75,237 (74%)	$7,416,541
October 16, 2015	55,705 / 75,237 (74%)	$7,416,541
October 17, 2015	55,705 / 75,237 (74%)	$7,416,541
October 21, 2015	55,705 / 75,237 (74%)	$7,416,541
October 23, 2015	55,705 / 75,237 (74%)	$7,416,541
October 24, 2015	55,705 / 75,237 (74%)	$7,416,541
October 28, 2015	55,705 / 75,237 (74%)	$7,416,541
October 30, 2015	55,705 / 75,237 (74%)	$7,416,541
October 31, 2015	55,705 / 75,237 (74%)	$7,416,541
November 4, 2015	55,705 / 75,237 (74%)	$7,416,541
November 6, 2015	55,705 / 75,237 (74%)	$7,416,541
November 7, 2015	55,705 / 75,237 (74%)	$7,416,541
November 11, 2015	55,705 / 75,237 (74%)	$7,416,541
November 13, 2015	55,705 / 75,237 (74%)	$7,416,541
November 14, 2015	55,705 / 75,237 (74%)	$7,416,541
November 18, 2015	55,705 / 75,237 (74%)	$7,416,541
November 20, 2015	55,705 / 75,237 (74%)	$7,416,541
November 21, 2015	55,705 / 75,237 (74%)	$7,416,541
Leg 11
December 27, 2015	19,454 / 25,203 (77%)	$2,940,106
December 28, 2015	19,454 / 25,203 (77%)	$2,940,106
December 30, 2015	19,454 / 25,203 (77%)	$2,940,106
December 31, 2015	19,454 / 25,203 (77%)	$2,940,106
January 2, 2016	19,454 / 25,203 (77%)	$2,940,106
January 3, 2016	19,454 / 25,203 (77%)	$2,940,106
Leg 12
February 13, 2016	28,540 / 34,488 (83%)	$4,007,691
February 14, 2016	28,540 / 34,488 (83%)	$4,007,691
February 17, 2016	28,540 / 34,488 (83%)	$4,007,691
February 19, 2016	28,540 / 34,488 (83%)	$4,007,691
February 20, 2016	28,540 / 34,488 (83%)	$4,007,691
February 24, 2016	28,540 / 34,488 (83%)	$4,007,691
February 26, 2016	28,540 / 34,488 (83%)	$4,007,691
February 27, 2016	28,540 / 34,488 (83%)	$4,007,691
Leg 13
April 6, 2016	31,678 / 34,440 (92%)	$4,547,675
April 8, 2016	31,678 / 34,440 (92%)	$4,547,675
April 9, 2016	31,678 / 34,440 (92%)	$4,547,675
April 13, 2016	31,678 / 34,440 (92%)	$4,547,675
April 15, 2016	31,678 / 34,440 (92%)	$4,547,675
April 16, 2016	31,678 / 34,440 (92%)	$4,547,675
April 20, 2016	31,678 / 34,440 (92%)	$4,547,675
April 22, 2016	31,678 / 34,440 (92%)	$4,547,675
Leg 14
June 17, 2016	44,040 / 51,219 (86%)	$6,318,232
June 18, 2016	44,040 / 51,219 (86%)	$6,318,232
June 22, 2016	44,040 / 51,219 (86%)	$6,318,232
June 24, 2016	44,040 / 51,219 (86%)	$6,318,232
June 25, 2016	44,040 / 51,219 (86%)	$6,318,232
June 29, 2016	44,040 / 51,219 (86%)	$6,318,232
July 1, 2016	44,040 / 51,219 (86%)	$6,318,232
July 2, 2016	44,040 / 51,219 (86%)	$6,318,232
July 6, 2016	44,040 / 51,219 (86%)	$6,318,232
July 8, 2016	44,040 / 51,219 (86%)	$6,318,232
July 9, 2016	44,040 / 51,219 (86%)	$6,318,232
July 13, 2016	44,040 / 51,219 (86%)	$6,318,232
Leg 15
August 17, 2016	38,533 / 42,493 (91%)	$5,726,766
August 19, 2016	38,533 / 42,493 (91%)	$5,726,766
August 20, 2016	38,533 / 42,493 (91%)	$5,726,766
August 24, 2016	38,533 / 42,493 (91%)	$5,726,766
August 31, 2016	38,533 / 42,493 (91%)	$5,726,766
September 2, 2016	38,533 / 42,493 (91%)	$5,726,766
September 3, 2016	38,533 / 42,493 (91%)	$5,726,766
September 7, 2016	38,533 / 42,493 (91%)	$5,726,766
September 9, 2016	38,533 / 42,493 (91%)	$5,726,766
September 10, 2016	38,533 / 42,493 (91%)	$5,726,766
Leg 16
October 19, 2016 (Note: The October 19, 2016, show was originally scheduled to take place on August 26, 2016, but was rescheduled due to "scheduling conflicts".)	49,934 / 63,163 (79%)	$7,292,060
October 21, 2016	49,934 / 63,163 (79%)	$7,292,060
October 22, 2016	49,934 / 63,163 (79%)	$7,292,060
October 26, 2016	49,934 / 63,163 (79%)	$7,292,060
October 28, 2016	49,934 / 63,163 (79%)	$7,292,060
October 29, 2016	49,934 / 63,163 (79%)	$7,292,060
November 2, 2016	49,934 / 63,163 (79%)	$7,292,060
November 4, 2016	49,934 / 63,163 (79%)	$7,292,060
November 5, 2016	49,934 / 63,163 (79%)	$7,292,060
November 9, 2016	49,934 / 63,163 (79%)	$7,292,060
November 11, 2016	49,934 / 63,163 (79%)	$7,292,060
November 12, 2016	49,934 / 63,163 (79%)	$7,292,060
November 16, 2016	49,934 / 63,163 (79%)	$7,292,060
November 18, 2016	49,934 / 63,163 (79%)	$7,292,060
November 19, 2016	49,934 / 63,163 (79%)	$7,292,060
Leg 17
January 11, 2017 (Note: The January 11, 2017, show was originally scheduled to take place on August 27, 2016, but was rescheduled due to "scheduling conflicts".)	41,185 / 50,755 (81%)	$6,139,697
January 13, 2017	41,185 / 50,755 (81%)	$6,139,697
January 14, 2017	41,185 / 50,755 (81%)	$6,139,697
January 18, 2017	41,185 / 50,755 (81%)	$6,139,697
January 20, 2017	41,185 / 50,755 (81%)	$6,139,697
January 21, 2017	41,185 / 50,755 (81%)	$6,139,697
January 25, 2017	41,185 / 50,755 (81%)	$6,139,697
January 27, 2017	41,185 / 50,755 (81%)	$6,139,697
January 28, 2017	41,185 / 50,755 (81%)	$6,139,697
February 1, 2017	41,185 / 50,755 (81%)	$6,139,697
February 3, 2017	41,185 / 50,755 (81%)	$6,139,697
February 4, 2017	41,185 / 50,755 (81%)	$6,139,697
Leg 18
March 22, 2017	37,160 / 40,555 (92%)	$5,427,295
March 24, 2017	37,160 / 40,555 (92%)	$5,427,295
March 25, 2017	37,160 / 40,555 (92%)	$5,427,295
March 29, 2017	37,160 / 40,555 (92%)	$5,427,295
March 31, 2017	37,160 / 40,555 (92%)	$5,427,295
April 1, 2017	37,160 / 40,555 (92%)	$5,427,295
April 5, 2017	37,160 / 40,555 (92%)	$5,427,295
April 7, 2017	37,160 / 40,555 (92%)	$5,427,295
April 8, 2017	37,160 / 40,555 (92%)	$5,427,295
Leg 19
May 3, 2017	37,712 / 40,541 (93%)	$5,855,011
May 5, 2017	37,712 / 40,541 (93%)	$5,855,011
May 6, 2017	37,712 / 40,541 (93%)	$5,855,011
May 10, 2017	37,712 / 40,541 (93%)	$5,855,011
May 12, 2017	37,712 / 40,541 (93%)	$5,855,011
May 13, 2017	37,712 / 40,541 (93%)	$5,855,011
May 17, 2017	37,712 / 40,541 (93%)	$5,855,011
May 19, 2017	37,712 / 40,541 (93%)	$5,855,011
May 20, 2017	37,712 / 40,541 (93%)	$5,855,011
Leg 20
August 9, 2017	48,592 / 56,632 (86%)	$8,114,558
August 11, 2017	48,592 / 56,632 (86%)	$8,114,558
August 12, 2017	48,592 / 56,632 (86%)	$8,114,558
August 16, 2017	48,592 / 56,632 (86%)	$8,114,558
August 18, 2017	48,592 / 56,632 (86%)	$8,114,558
August 19, 2017	48,592 / 56,632 (86%)	$8,114,558
August 23, 2017	48,592 / 56,632 (86%)	$8,114,558
August 25, 2017	48,592 / 56,632 (86%)	$8,114,558
August 26, 2017	48,592 / 56,632 (86%)	$8,114,558
August 30, 2017	48,592 / 56,632 (86%)	$8,114,558
September 1, 2017	48,592 / 56,632 (86%)	$8,114,558
September 2, 2017	48,592 / 56,632 (86%)	$8,114,558
September 3, 2017	48,592 / 56,632 (86%)	$8,114,558
Leg 21
October 11, 2017	50,462 / 52,847 (95%)	$8,588,938
October 13, 2017	50,462 / 52,847 (95%)	$8,588,938
October 14, 2017	50,462 / 52,847 (95%)	$8,588,938
October 18, 2017	50,462 / 52,847 (95%)	$8,588,938
October 20, 2017	50,462 / 52,847 (95%)	$8,588,938
October 21, 2017	50,462 / 52,847 (95%)	$8,588,938
October 25, 2017	50,462 / 52,847 (95%)	$8,588,938
October 27, 2017	50,462 / 52,847 (95%)	$8,588,938
October 28, 2017	50,462 / 52,847 (95%)	$8,588,938
November 1, 2017	50,462 / 52,847 (95%)	$8,588,938
November 3, 2017	50,462 / 52,847 (95%)	$8,588,938
November 4, 2017	50,462 / 52,847 (95%)	$8,588,938
Leg 22
December 19, 2017	22,543 / 22,665 (99%)	$4,757,135
December 27, 2017	22,543 / 22,665 (99%)	$4,757,135
December 28, 2017	22,543 / 22,665 (99%)	$4,757,135
December 30, 2017	22,543 / 22,665 (99%)	$4,757,135
December 31, 2017	22,543 / 22,665 (99%)	$4,757,135
Total	916,875 / 1,077,648 (85%)	$137,695,392

=== Cancelled shows ===
Date	City	Reason for cancellation
May 1, 2015	Las Vegas	Ankle sprain

== See also ==
- List of highest-grossing concert series at a single venue
- List of most-attended concert series at a single venue
