= To Die For (disambiguation) =

To Die For is a 1995 film directed by Gus Van Sant and starring Nicole Kidman.

To Die For may also refer to:

- To Die For (1989 film), also known as Dracula: The Love Story, a horror-romance film directed by Deran Sarafian
- To Die For (1994 film), a British comedy-drama film directed by Peter Mackenzie Litten

== Music ==
- To/Die/For, a gothic metal band from the town of Kouvola in southeast of Finland
- To Die For (Integrity album), 2003, and the title track
- To Die For (B.I album), 2023
- "To Die For" (Sam Smith song)
- "To Die For" (Luke Galliana song)

== Other ==
- To Die For (novel), a 2004 American novel by Linda Howard

== See also ==
- 2 Die 4 (disambiguation)
