= Britney Jean =

2013 studio album by Britney Spears

- Standard edition cover (Note: Deluxe edition uses the same image, but in monochrome.)

Studio album by Britney Spears
- Released: November 29, 2013
- Recorded: May–October 2013
- Studios: The Future; Record Plant (Los Angeles); i85 (Westlake Village); Glenwood Place Studios (Burbank); DAZMO Music Studios (Montreal); Guerilla Studios (London); Piano Music Studios (Amsterdam); KBK Studios (Stockholm)
- Genres: Pop; EDM
- Length: 36:08
- Label: RCA
- Producers: A.C.; Chico Bennett; Christopher Braide; Peter Carlsson; Cirkut; Diplo; Dr. Luke; Freshmen III; David Guetta; Derek Weintraub; Zach "Reazon" Heiligman; Keith Harris; HyGrade; William "DJ Keebz" Kebler; Kool Kojak; LWAM; Sebastian Ingrosso; Damien LeRoy; William Orbit; Otto Knows; Anthony Preston; Nicky Romero; Giorgio Tuinfort; Marcus van Wattum; Richard Vission; will.i.am

Britney Spears chronology
The Essential Britney Spears (2013)	Britney Jean (2013)	Glory (2016)

Singles from Britney Jean
- 1. "Work Bitch" Released: September 15, 2013; 2. "Perfume" Released: November 3, 2013; 3. "Til It's Gone" Released: December 4, 2013; 4. "It Should Be Easy" Released: June 13, 2014

Britney Jean is the eighth studio album by American singer Britney Spears. It was released on November 29, 2013, by RCA Records. The album is Spears's second eponymous record after Britney (2001), though the album's name refers to both her first and middle names. It marks Spears's first major activity since the dissolution of her longtime record label, Jive Records, in 2011. The singer began recording material for Britney Jean in May 2013, eventually continuing into October of that year. On numerous occasions, Spears has described the album as the most personal record from her catalog. Having assumed an integral position in its production, she co-wrote each track and collaborated with songwriters and producers including Sia and will.i.am to achieve her desired sound. Furthermore, Britney Jean features guest vocals from Spears's younger sister Jamie Lynn, T.I., and will.i.am. Musically, the record contains strong elements of EDM and pop.

Critical reception for Britney Jean has been described as mixed or negative, who felt the album was impersonal despite its marketing, and were ambivalent towards its production. The record charted at number one in China and within the top 20 in Australia, Austria, Canada, the Czech Republic, Germany, Ireland, Italy, Japan, Norway, Spain, Switzerland, and the United States. It was also certified gold in Canada, Mexico, the United States, and Venezuela.

"Work Bitch" was released as the lead single from Britney Jean on September 17, 2013. The track debuted and peaked at number 12 on the US Billboard Hot 100 and was a moderate success worldwide. "Perfume" was released as the second single from the album on November 3, 2013, and peaked at number 76 on the Billboard Hot 100. "Til It's Gone" impacted French radio on December 4, 2013, and "It Should Be Easy" impacted Italian radio on June 13, 2014, as the third and fourth single from the album, respectively. No further promotion was done for the record, a situation which was reported in the media. However, Spears appeared on Good Morning America on September 17, 2013, to announce a two-year (eventually extended to four years) residency show at Planet Hollywood Las Vegas, titled Britney: Piece of Me, which began on December 27, 2013, and concluded on December 31, 2017.

== Recording and production ==
"I wanted to just go to lunch for two months, which is totally different from how you typically do it. I said, 'Let's talk about what you're excited about. Let's talk about things you've done in your career, what you're happy about. Let's talk about spending time with your kids, let's talk about your breakup. Let's talk about how now you're single, how independent you might feel.' We started talking about all that stuff. So I said, 'do you mind if I write this down? I don't mean to impose but I want to interview you. I need this to create a filter.'"

— will.i.am describing his relationship with Spears during production of Britney Jean.

During January 2013, Britney Spears's representative mentioned the singer working with producer Hit-Boy to create a "global sound" fusing elements of hip-hop and pop. Producer Scoop DeVille had also worked with Spears for the album's early stages. Additionally, Spears had also recorded an unused song titled "Police" with rapper Wiz Khalifa for the album. In an interview with Shape, Spears described the album's initial concept as having a hip-hop feel, saying "the record is definitely going to be more hip-hop than pop this time around."

In May 2013, Naughty Boy and William Orbit were announced to be working on the record; the former expressed his satisfaction with his collaborations with Spears, adding that he had wanted always wanted to "do something a bit different." Later that month, will.i.am was confirmed as the executive producer of the project. He described that his recording process differed from his past experience with the Black Eyed Peas, elaborating that "[he and Spears] had these juicy sessions, where [they had] been bonding, building the trust and comfort." The album's associate executive producer was Anthony Preston for will.i.am music. In July 2013, Spears acknowledged through Twitter that she "wrote such a special song" with Sia, which was later revealed to be Spears's favorite track, the ballad "Perfume". The following month, she reportedly traveled to Lake District in the United Kingdom to continue work with Naughty Boy and Orbit. Charli XCX revealed in a 2022 interview that she wrote material for the album, but none of it made the cut.

On numerous occasions before the end of her conservatorship, Spears had considered Britney Jean to be the most personal record from her catalog. She stated that her experiences in recent years, including her break-up with ex-fiancé Jason Trawick, encouraged her to "dig deeper and write songs that [she thinks] everyone can relate to." Spears added that the production of the record was an "amazing experience" and that her colleagues "helped [her] bring [her ideas] to life." Spears told Rudolph, "I want Will to be a central figure in the album; I don't want to have hundreds of songs sent over."

== Composition ==
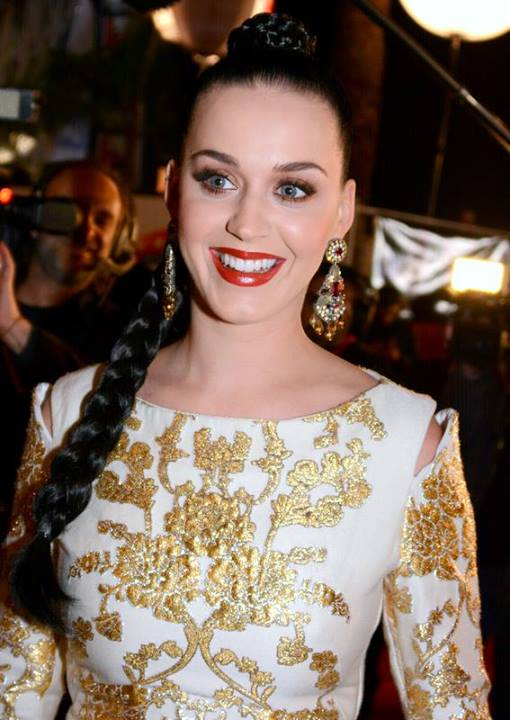
"Passenger" was originally recorded by Katy Perry for her album Prism.

Britney Jean has been described as a concept album about "the loneliness of pop life." The opening track "Alien" deems celebrity an isolating experience that Spears describes in terms of feeling like an extraterrestrial over synth bleaps, which according to some critics, "it echoes William Orbit work with Madonna on Ray of Light." The second track "Work Bitch" is an EDM song, where Spears sings about what it takes to be rich, famous and beautiful, repeatedly encouraging listeners to "get to work, bitch." The third track "Perfume" is a 1980s-influenced power ballad, which Spears described as "incredibly special to me because it hits close to home, and I think the story is relatable to everyone. Everyone's been through an insecure moment in a relationship that's left them vulnerable and I think this song captures that." The fourth track "It Should Be Easy", which features will.i.am, insists that love "shouldn't be complicated," with Spears imagining a bright-normal-future with a man who's stolen her heart, with "robotized" voice and EDM beats. The song was heavily criticized for the excessive use of Auto-Tune, credited by will.i.am. The album's fifth track "Tik Tik Boom" finds Spears begging a lover to make her "tik, tik, tik, tik, boom" over trap beats. It was described as a "club banger" and "the closest the album comes to bringing Blackout 2.0 to life," featuring a "sex-drenched" appearance from rapper T.I.

"Body Ache" follows with its lyrical theme about dancing hard in a club, over shrieking sirens and EDM beats, whilst "Til It's Gone" gives value to the stability of a good relationship, albeit after it dissolves, with its electronic and EDM sounds. With the eighth track "Passenger,” which noodles around with some EDM impulses before imploding into "brooding" pop-rock, Spears emotes about finding happiness after being willing to cede control. "Chillin' with You" features Spears's younger sister Jamie Lynn into a song about grasping at happiness over lush trap, EDM and country pop sound. The album's closing track on the standard edition, "Don't Cry", opens with a spaghetti Western-esque whistle, and it finds Spears refusing to give in to post-relationship grief. Some critics labelled it "her best vocal performance on the album."

== Title and artwork ==
On October 15, 2013, during an appearance on Capital London, she announced that the record would be titled Britney Jean, a nickname used affectionately by her family and friends. A report from ABC News Radio likened the usage of Spears's middle name in the album's title to being inspired by Janet Jackson's eighth studio album Damita Jo, saying "taking a page from Janet Jackson's 2004 album, Damita Jo, Britney Spears has combined her first and middle names—Britney Jean—to come up with the title." Christopher Rosen for HuffPost later suggested that the neon-style typography was inspired by the cover of Miley Cyrus' fourth studio album Bangerz (2013), which itself depicts a blonde Cyrus wearing a short black coat with the title "Bangerz" stylized in fluorescent neon lighting in front of palm trees. While the typography was compared to that of Bangerz by a writer from HuffPost, Britney Jean marks the third album artwork from RCA Records to use a neon-style typography design, Bangerz from Miley Cyrus being one and the other being Mechanical Bull from Kings of Leon. Byron Flitsch of MTV News shared a similar sentiment, and added that the artwork was reminiscent of Spears’s fourth and seventh records In the Zone (2003) and Femme Fatale (2011). On November 4, a colorized version of the cover was unveiled as the primary visual for the standard edition, with the original cover becoming the primary visual for the deluxe edition.

== Release and promotion ==
In May 2013, record producer Danja, who collaborated with Spears during its production, commented that he "[doesn't] know when the next [Blackout] is going to be, but [he believes] there's going to be another one." On August 20, 2013, Spears relaunched her website with a countdown ending on September 17, originally speculated to be the release date of her then-unannounced lead single. On September 17, Spears announced on Good Morning America that her album would be released on December 3, 2013, in the United States, the day after her 32nd birthday. On November 4, the album was made available for pre-order through the iTunes Store. Spears revealed the track listing for Britney Jean on November 12, which she implied was earlier than she planned after hackers "[tried] to ruin [her] surprises." On November 20, the album leaked online, prompting the singer to address the leaks by saying: "To those of you listening to the leaks... I hope you love... I made this album specifically for my diehard fans so I'm just hoping every song touches you because each one is a piece of me.” The record is additionally marked with the Parental Advisory label, affixed by the Recording Industry Association of America (RIAA) to identify explicit content.

Unlike her previous records, excluding her fifth studio album Blackout (2007), Spears did not heavily promote Britney Jean, and no promotional performances in support of the album took place. However, she appeared on Good Morning America to announce her two-year residency show at Planet Hollywood Resort & Casino, titled Britney: Piece of Me, on September 17. Spears then traveled to the United Kingdom to promote the lead single and the album on Alan Carr: Chatty Man. She also appeared for interviews on The Ellen DeGeneres Show, Entertainment Tonight, and Surprise Surprise. Britney Jean was additionally promoted through the documentary I Am Britney Jean, which premiered through E! on December 22; it covered the production and lead-up to its release and the launch of Britney: Piece of Me. The original airing of the special in the United States was viewed by 0.706 million viewers, garnering above-average Sunday ratings for the network, while it was viewed by 0.63 million viewers in the United Kingdom. Britney: Piece of Me began on December 27, with tickets having been first made available on September 20.

== Singles ==
"Work Bitch" was released as the lead single from Britney Jean on September 15, 2013, one day earlier than expected after a low-quality version was leaked by "one bad apple". A writer for MuuMuse described the track as a "massive return to form" and an "exciting way to kick off a brand new era". It debuted and peaked at number 12 on the US Billboard Hot 100 with 174,000 first-week downloads, and charted moderately on national singles charts internationally. An accompanying music video for the track was premiered on October 1, where Spears is depicted as a dominatrix-like character. Spears herself commented that she felt forced into maintaining her provocative image, elaborating that she "cut out half the video because I am a mother and because, you know, I have children, and it's just hard to play sexy mom while you're being a pop star as well".

"Perfume" was released as the second single from Britney Jean on November 3, 2013. It charted at number 76 on the Billboard Hot 100.

"Til It's Gone" was sent to French radio as the third single on December 4, 2013, where it failed to chart.

Official remixes for "It Should Be Easy" were commissioned and serviced to clubs in January 2014. A spokesperson for Spears said that it would not see a release as a fourth single and that the remixes were "commissioned purely to be used in nightclubs". However, on June 13, 2014, "It Should Be Easy" was made available to Italian radio stations, according to EarOne. "It Should Be Easy" charted at number 121 in France, number 88 in Canada and number 71 in Switzerland due to digital downloads.

Official remixes for "Tik Tik Boom" were also commissioned and serviced in February 2014. "Tik Tik Boom" charted at number 16 on South Korea's International Gaon Digital Chart.

In the documentary I Am Britney Jean, Spears mentions "Alien" becoming a single from the album at some point, but this never came to fruition. Despite not being released as a single, "Alien" charted at number eight on the US Bubbling Under Hot 100, and 147 on the French Singles Chart, organized by the Syndicat National de l'Édition Phonographique.

== Critical reception ==
Professional ratings
Aggregate scores
Source	Rating
AnyDecentMusic?	4.9/10
Metacritic	50/100
Review scores
Source	Rating
AllMusic	2.5/5 stars
The A.V. Club	C
Chicago Tribune	2/4 stars
Entertainment Weekly	B+
The Guardian	2/5 stars
The Independent	2/5 stars
Los Angeles Times	1.5/4 stars
Rolling Stone	3.5/5 stars
Slant Magazine	2.5/5 stars
Spin	3/10

Upon release, reviews for Britney Jean were described as generally mixed or negative. At Metacritic, which assigns a normalized rating out of 100 to reviews from mainstream critics, the album received an average score of 50, which indicates "mixed or average reviews", based on 21 reviews. Jason Lipshutz from Billboard provided a favorable review, describing the project as a "transitional record [as] her first album released in her thirties", and felt it was reminiscent of Spears's third studio album Britney (2001). Nick Catucci of Entertainment Weekly shared a similar sentiment, stating that he "treasures" Spears for "[remaining] as enigmatic as the Disney-groomed, emotionally insulated teen who greeted us in the late '90s", and adding that will.i.am's production "happily indulges the fantasies of endorphin-seeking EDM festival goers." Writing for Rolling Stone, Rob Sheffield described Britney Jean as a "concept album about the loneliness of pop life – with a high-profile broken engagement behind her, Brit gets personal and drops her most bummed-out music ever."

Some critics felt the album was impersonal despite its marketing. Chicago Tribune compared the album's contents to its title, noting: "the hype about her most 'personal' album yet begins with the album title [...] which promotes a sense of intimacy that the songs never quite deliver." The Atlantic described the album as "her most disappointing release yet", calling it "dull" and criticized the album's content matter, noting that "glimpses into Britney Jean Spears, the artist, are, frankly, neither interesting nor informative." Neil McCormick of The Daily Telegraph stated that Britney Jean "continues the striptease of Britney's career", and felt that its production prevented the record from coming across as a genuinely personal effort. Billboard noted that the album did "not fully shed light on its author's current mindset", and The New York Times described the album as being "about as personal as an airline preboarding announcement."

The production on the album was also pointed out by critics. Sal Cinquemani from Slant Magazine provided a mixed review, criticizing the album's "dated production and vocals that hark back to the days when Brit was selling 10 million [records]." Barry Walters from Spin criticized will.i.am's production on the album, claiming that the songs he produced "replace[d] melody with repetition and familiarity," but praised Spears's vocal delivery on "Don't Cry".

== Accolades ==
Year	Award	Category	Nominee(s)	Result	Ref.
2013	Billboard Mid-Year Music Award	Most Anticipated Event	Britney Jean (Note: At the time of 2013 Billboard Mid-Year Music Awards, the title of the album had not yet been revealed, therefore Britney Jean was nominated as "[Spears's] next musical project.”)	Won	
2014	PopCrush Fan Choice Award	Song of the Year	"Work Bitch"	Nominated	
2014	PopCrush Fan Choice Award	Video of the Year	"Work Bitch"	Nominated	
2014	PopCrush Fan Choice Award	Best Music Documentary	I Am Britney Jean	Nominated	
2014	World Music Award	World's Best Album	Britney Jean	Nominated	
2014	World Music Award	World's Best Song	"Work Bitch"	Nominated	
2014	World Music Award	World's Best Song	"Perfume"	Nominated	
2014	World Music Award	World's Best Video	"Work Bitch"	Nominated	
2014	World Music Award	World's Best Video	"Perfume"	Nominated	

== Commercial performance ==
In the United States, Britney Jean debuted at number four on the Billboard 200 with 107,000 units. It is Spears's lowest sales and chart debut for a studio set. Previously, her 1999 debut album, ...Baby One More Time, tallied her smallest start with 121,000. In its second week on the chart, the album fell from number four to number 22 on the Billboard 200, making it Spears's first album to spend only one week in the top ten. As of May 2020, Britney Jean has sold 280,000 copies in the United States.

In Europe, Britney Jean debuted at number 34 on the UK Albums Chart, selling 12,959 copies in its first week. In doing so, it became Spears's lowest-charting album in the country; by comparison, her previous lowest-charting record In the Zone (2003) peaked at number 13. It dropped to number 87 the next week. Internationally, Britney Jean reached the top 20 and 30 in most countries. However, the album debuted at number one in China.

== Track listing ==
Standard edition
No.	Title	Writer(s)	Producer(s)	Length
1.	"Alien"	Britney Spears; Ana Diaz; Anthony Preston; Dan Traynor; William Orbit	Orbit; HyGrade; Preston^{[a]}	3:56
2.	"Work Bitch"	Spears; William Adams; Otto Jettman; Sebastian Ingrosso; Preston; Ruth-Anne Cunningham	Ingrosso; Otto Knows; will.i.am; Derek Weintraub; Preston^{[a]}	4:08
3.	"Perfume"	Spears; Sia Furler; Christopher Braide	will.i.am; Keith Harris^{[b]}; Braide^{[b]}	4:00
4.	"It Should Be Easy" (featuring will.i.am)	Spears; Adams; David Guetta; Giorgio Tuinfort; Nick Rotteveel; Marcus van Wattum	Guetta; Tuinfort; Nicky Romero; van Wattum; will.i.am^{[a]}; Preston^{[a]}	3:29
5.	"Tik Tik Boom" (featuring T.I.)	Spears; Clifford Joseph Harris, Jr.; Preston; Onique "Sparrow" Williams; Andre Lindal; Damien LeRoy; Joakim Haukaas	Preston; LeRoy^{[b]}	2:57
6.	"Body Ache"	Spears; Guetta; Tuinfort; Luciana Caporaso; Nick Clow; Myah Marie Langston; Preston; Richard Gonzalez; Jose Luna	Guetta; Tuinfort; will.i.am; Preston^{[a]}	3:26
7.	"Til It's Gone"	Spears; Jenson Vaughan; Rosette Sharma; Preston; Tuinfort; Guetta; Adams	Tuinfort; will.i.am; Preston^{[b]}	3:43
8.	"Passenger"	Spears; Thomas Pentz; Furler; Andrew Swanson; Katy Perry	Diplo; Preston^{[a]}	3:41
9.	"Chillin' with You" (featuring Jamie Lynn)	Spears; Adams; Preston; Joshua Lopez	will.i.am; Freshmen III^{[b]}; Preston^{[a]}	3:39
10.	"Don't Cry"	Spears; Adams; Lopez; Gonzalez	will.i.am; Richard Vission^{[b]}; Chico Bennett^{[b]}; Zach "Reazon" Heiligman^{[c]}; William "DJ Keebz" Kebler^{[c]}; LWAM^{[c]}	3:15
Total length:				36:08

Deluxe edition
No.	Title	Writer(s)	Producer(s)	Length
11.	"Brightest Morning Star"	Spears; Lukasz Gottwald; Furler; Henry Walter	Dr. Luke; Cirkut; Braide^{[a]}; Preston^{[a]}	3:00
12.	"Hold on Tight"	Spears; Allan P. Grigg	Kool Kojak; A.C; Preston^{[a]}; Peter Carlsson^{[a]}	3:28
13.	"Now That I Found You"	Spears; Danny O'Donoghue; Tuinfort; Guetta; Frédéric Riesterer	Tuinfort; will.i.am; Preston^{[b]}	4:17
14.	"Perfume" (The Dreaming Mix)	Spears; Furler; Braide	Braide	4:02
Total length:				50:48

=== Notes ===
- ^{^[a]} signifies a vocal producer
- ^{^[b]} signifies a co-producer
- ^{^[c]} signifies an additional producer
- "Work Bitch" and its corresponding remixes on the Japanese and Chinese edition are titled "Work Work" on the clean editions of the album.
- "Hold on Tight" was misprinted as "Hold on Tite" on the back cover of early CD pressings, but this was corrected on the Japanese edition.
- Japanese and Chinese edition include the Jane Doze and 7th Heaven Remix of "Work Bitch".

== Personnel ==
Credits adapted from AllMusic.

- Daniel Andrés Aguilar – assistant, assistant vocal engineer
- David Beckham – producer
- Joe Bozzi – mastering
- Christopher Braide – producer, vocal producer
- Mark Cargill – concert master
- AJ Clark – assistant, assistant vocal engineer
- Daddy's Groove – mixing
- Jacob Dennis – assistant vocal engineer
- Ana Diaz – vocals
- Michelangelo Di Battista – photography
- Diplo – producer
- Dylan Dresdow – vocal mixing
- Karen Elaine – viola
- Vanessa Freebairn-Smith – cello
- Sia – background vocals
- Freshm3n III – producer
- Lucine Fyelon – violin
- Şerban Ghenea – mixing
- Onree Gill – string arrangements
- Rachel Grace – violin
- David Guetta – engineer, instrumentation, producer, programming
- Neel Hammond – viola
- John Hanes – mixing engineer
- Keith Harris – producer
- Joakim Harestad Haukaas – guitar
- Zach Heiligman – additional production
- Billy Hickey – assistant vocal engineer
- Ghazi Hourani – assistant
- Todd Hurtt – assistant vocal engineer
- Hygrade – musician, producer, programming
- Frances Iacuzzi – photography
- Sebastian Ingrosso – engineer, musician, producer, programming
- Chris Kahn – assistant vocal engineer
- William Kebler "Keebz" – additional production
- Padraic "Padlock" Kerin – engineer, project coordinator, vocal editing
- Damien Leroy – instrumentation, producer, programming
- Andre Lindal – guitar, instrumentation, programming, vocal editing
- Joshua Lopez – acoustic guitar
- Ginny Luke – violin
- LWAM – additional production
- Myah Marie – background vocals, lead vocal assistant
- Alan O'Connell – engineer
- William Orbit – musician, producer, programming
- Otto Knows – engineer, musician, producer, programming
- Joe Peluso – mixing, string engineer
- Anthony Preston – associate executive producer, instrumentation, producer, programming, vocal producer, background vocals
- Julian Prindle – project coordinator, vocal editing, vocal engineer
- Pierre-Luc Rioux – guitar
- Nicky Romero – instrumentation, mixing, producer, programming
- Bradford H. Smith – assistant, assistant vocal engineer
- Britney Spears – lead vocals, composer
- Jamie Lynn Spears – background vocals, guest vocals
- Alan Tilston – engineer
- JoAnn Tominaga – music contractor
- Giorgio Tuinfort – engineer, instrumentation, piano, producer, programming
- Michael Valerio – bass
- Richard Vission – producer
- Marcus Van Wattum – instrumentation, mixing, producer, programming, sound design
- Ralph Wegner – sound design
- will.i.am – engineer, executive producer, instrumentation, producer, programming, vocal producer, guest vocals
- Adrienne Woods – cello

== Charts ==
=== Weekly charts ===
Weekly chart performance
Chart (2013–2016)	Peak position
Australian Albums (ARIA)	12
Austrian Albums (Ö3 Austria)	13
Belgian Albums (Ultratop Flanders)	32
Belgian Albums (Ultratop Wallonia)	26
Canadian Albums (Billboard)	7
Chinese Albums (Sino)	1
Croatian Albums (HDU)	29
Czech Albums (ČNS IFPI)	17
Danish Albums (Hitlisten)	27
Dutch Albums (Album Top 100)	36
Finnish Albums (Suomen virallinen lista)	24
French Albums (SNEP)	22
German Albums (Offizielle Top 100)	20
Greek Albums (IFPI)	26
Italian Albums (FIMI)	14
Irish Albums (IRMA)	15
Japanese Albums (Oricon)	17
New Zealand Albums (RMNZ)	22
Norwegian Albums (VG-lista)	16
Polish Albums (ZPAV)	45
Scottish Albums (Official Charts)	30
South Korean Albums (Circle) Deluxe edition	20
South Korean Albums (Circle)	21
South Korean International Albums (Circle) Deluxe edition	5
South Korean International Albums (Circle)	6
Spanish Albums (Promusicae)	12
Swedish Albums (Sverigetopplistan)	28
Swiss Albums (Schweizer Hitparade)	9
UK Albums (Official Charts)	34
US Billboard 200	4

Weekly chart performance
Chart (2017–2020)	Peak position
South Korean International Albums (Gaon)	17
US Vinyl Albums (Billboard)	3

=== Monthly charts ===
Monthly chart performance
Chart (2013)	Peak position
Argentine Albums (CAPIF)	7
South Korean Albums (Gaon) Deluxe edition	67
South Korean Albums (Gaon)	74

=== Year-end charts ===
2013 year-end chart performance
Chart (2013)	Position
Argentine Albums (CAPIF)	93
Belgian Albums (Ultratop Wallonia)	199

2014 year-end chart performance
Chart (2014)	Position
US Billboard 200	74

== Certifications and sales ==
Certifications and sales
Region	Certification	Certified units/sales
Canada (Music Canada)	Gold	40,000^{^}
France	—	25,000
Japan	—	8,417
Mexico (AMPROFON)	Gold	30,000^{^}
South Korea (Gaon)	—	1,880
United States (RIAA)	Gold	500,000^{‡}
Venezuela (APFV)	Gold	5,000
Summaries
Worldwide	—	700,000
^{^} Shipments figures based on certification alone.^{‡} Sales+streaming figures based on certification alone.

== Release history ==
Release history
Region	Date	Edition(s)	Format(s)	Label	Ref.
Australia	November 29, 2013	Deluxe	CD; digital download	Sony	
Finland	November 29, 2013	Standard; deluxe	CD; digital download	Sony	
Germany	November 29, 2013	Standard; deluxe	CD; digital download	Sony	
France	December 2, 2013	Standard; deluxe	CD; digital download	Sony	
United Kingdom	December 2, 2013	Deluxe	CD; digital download	RCA	
Canada	December 3, 2013	Standard; deluxe	CD; digital download	Sony	
United States	December 3, 2013	Standard; deluxe	CD; digital download	RCA	
Japan	December 4, 2013	Deluxe	CD; digital download	Sony	
Philippines	January 17, 2014	Deluxe	CD	Ivory	
China	April 14, 2014	Deluxe	CD	Sony	
United States	April 17, 2020	Deluxe	Vinyl (Urban Outfitters exclusive)	Legacy	
United States	May 17, 2021	Deluxe	Vinyl (Urban Outfitters exclusive)	Legacy	
United States	May 23, 2021	Deluxe	Cassette (Urban Outfitters exclusive)	Legacy	
United States	March 31, 2023	Standard	Vinyl	Legacy	
