= Matt Walters (musician) =

Australian entrepreneur and musician

Matt Walters is an Australian entrepreneur and musician based in country Victoria, Australia. Walters has toured with musician Tori Amos. His music found an audience online when he self released his debut album, Farewell Youth, in 2011.

== Career ==
Matt Walters was originally signed to Mercury Records (Universal) whilst studying film at RMIT University in Melbourne in 2009. His debut album, Farewell Youth, was released in 2011.

In 2015, Walters launched Parlour, an online platform for artists to book in house shows with their biggest fans. The platform has been used by notable Australian and US artists and has facilitated over 2000 gigs worldwide. Parlour's technology concentrate(s) on using data that artists can gather from platforms such as Facebook, Spotify, and other similar platforms, to actually figure out where an artist can tour and where their fans actually exist.

== Discography ==
=== Studio albums ===
List of albums, with selected details
Title	Details
Farewell Youth	Released: 2011; Format: CD, digital; Label: Mercury (2763947)
NightWalk	Released: November 2014; Format: digital; Label: Everyday Rebellion

=== EPs ===
List of EPs, with selected details and chart positions
Title	EP details	Peak chart positions
Title	EP details	AUS Physical
Echo On	Released: 2009; Label: Mercury (2704433); Format: CD, digital	—
Talking in My Sleep	Released: October 2010; Label: Mercury (2751625); Format: CD, digital	30
Vacant Heart	Released: February 2013; Label: Matt Walters; Format: Digital	—
