= Don't Cry (Édith Piaf song) =

"C'est de la faute à tes yeux", is a 1951 song written and sung by Édith Piaf. It became better known in English as "Don't Cry", with new lyrics written for Piaf by Eddie Constantine. Columbia released the English version of the song as 7" in the States on February 12, 1951, with "Chante Moi", by David & Piaf as the B-side.
