= Cry for Me =

Cry for Me may refer to:

- "Cry for Me" (Camila Cabello song), 2019
- "Cry for Me" (Twice song), 2020
- "Cry for Me" (The Weeknd song), 2025
- "Cry for Me", a 2019 song by Compact Disk Dummies
- "Cry for Me", a song by Magdalena Bay from the 2024 album Imaginal Disk

== See also ==
- "Cry for Me WA WA WA", a song by Ironmouse, Shirobeats, HalaCG, and Bubi
- Cry for You (disambiguation)
- Don't Cry for Me (disambiguation)
