= Anthony Preston (music producer) =

American record producer and songwriter

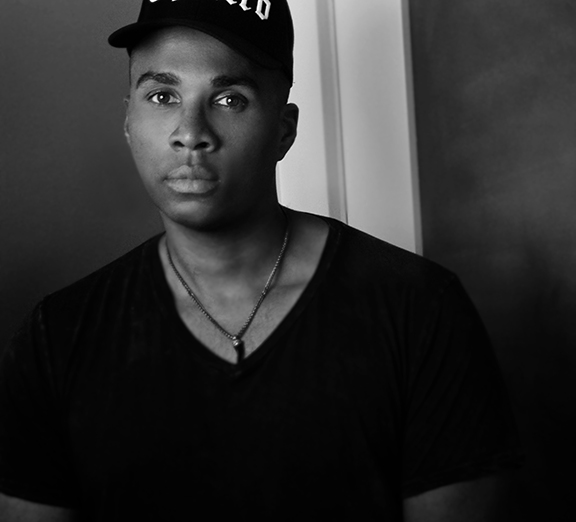

Background information
- Also known as: Antony Preston
- Born: Texarkana, Texas, USA
- Genres: Pop, hip hop, electronic, dance
- Occupations: Record producer, songwriter, music executive
- Years active: 2011–present

Anthony Preston is an American, Grammy-nominated record producer, songwriter and music executive. He frequently works with will.i.am.

== Early life ==
Preston was born and raised in Texarkana, Texas, to a teacher mother and minister father and has two brothers. In addition to singing, he has played various instruments, including piano, oboe, saxophone, drums and bassoon.

== Career ==
Early in his career, Preston moved to Atlanta, Georgia, and began working with various producers including Dallas Austin and Anthony Dent. Unsatisfied with the progress of his career, he considered quitting, until he met and began working and touring around the world with Chris Willis, and then David Guetta soon after. Preston co-wrote "Night of Your Life", Guetta's 2011 single featuring Jennifer Hudson, which peaked at #81 on the Billboard Hot 100.

In 2012, Preston was introduced to will.i.am, and they began to collaborate regularly, with Preston becoming creative liaison for will.i.am music group. In addition to Willis, Guetta and will.i.am, Preston has produced and written for Nicole Scherzinger, Jennifer Hudson, Afrojack, Pitbull, Havana Brown, Carly Rae Jepsen and Britney Spears.

Preston is the associate executive producer on Spears' eighth studio album, Britney Jean (2013), and is credited as a writer or producer on eleven tracks. He began working on the album in the beginning of 2013. "Work Bitch", which Preston co-wrote and co-produced, was released as the album's lead single on September 17, 2013, and peaked at #12 on the Billboard Hot 100.

== Discography ==
=== Production discography ===
Year	Song/Album	Artist	Credits
2011	"Night of Your Life"	David Guetta feat. Jennifer Hudson	Writer
2011	"Too Much In Love"	Chris Willis	Writer, co-producer
2011	"Alone"	Chris Willis	Writer, co-producer
2012	"Finish Line"	Suki Low	Writer, co-producer
2012	"Change Me (Why You Tryin' To)"	The Ones	Writer
2012	"Last Night"	Pitbull feat. Havana Brown and Afrojack	Writer
2012	"Fino all'estasi"/"Hasta El Extasis"	Eros Ramazzotti feat. Nicole Scherzinger	Writer, co-producer, vocal producer
2013	"Boomerang"	Nicole Scherzinger	Writer, co-producer, vocal producer
2013	"Hello"	will.i.am feat. Afrojack	Additional executive producer
2013	"My Love"	Ultra Naté	Writer
2013	"Immortal Love"	Maison & Dragen feat. Toni Nielson	Writer
2013	Britney Jean	Britney Spears	Associate executive producer
2013	"Work Bitch"	Britney Spears	Writer, vocal producer
2013	"Alien"	Britney Spears	Writer, vocal producer
2013	"It Should Be Easy"	Britney Spears feat. will.i.am.	Vocal producer
2013	"Tik Tik Boom"	Britney Spears feat. T.I.	Writer, producer, vocal producer
2013	"Body Ache"	Britney Spears	Writer, vocal producer
2013	"Til It's Gone"	Britney Spears	Writer, producer, vocal producer
2013	"Passenger"	Britney Spears	Vocal producer
2013	"Chillin' With You"	Britney Spears feat. Jamie Lynn	Writer, vocal producer
2013	"Brightest Morning Star"	Britney Spears	Vocal producer
2013	"Hold On Tight"	Britney Spears	Vocal producer
2013	"Now That I Found You"	Britney Spears	Vocal producer

=== Artist discography ===
- "Go Where the Love Is" (with Pedro Cazanova) (2012)
