= Ana Diaz (Swedish singer) =

Swedish singer

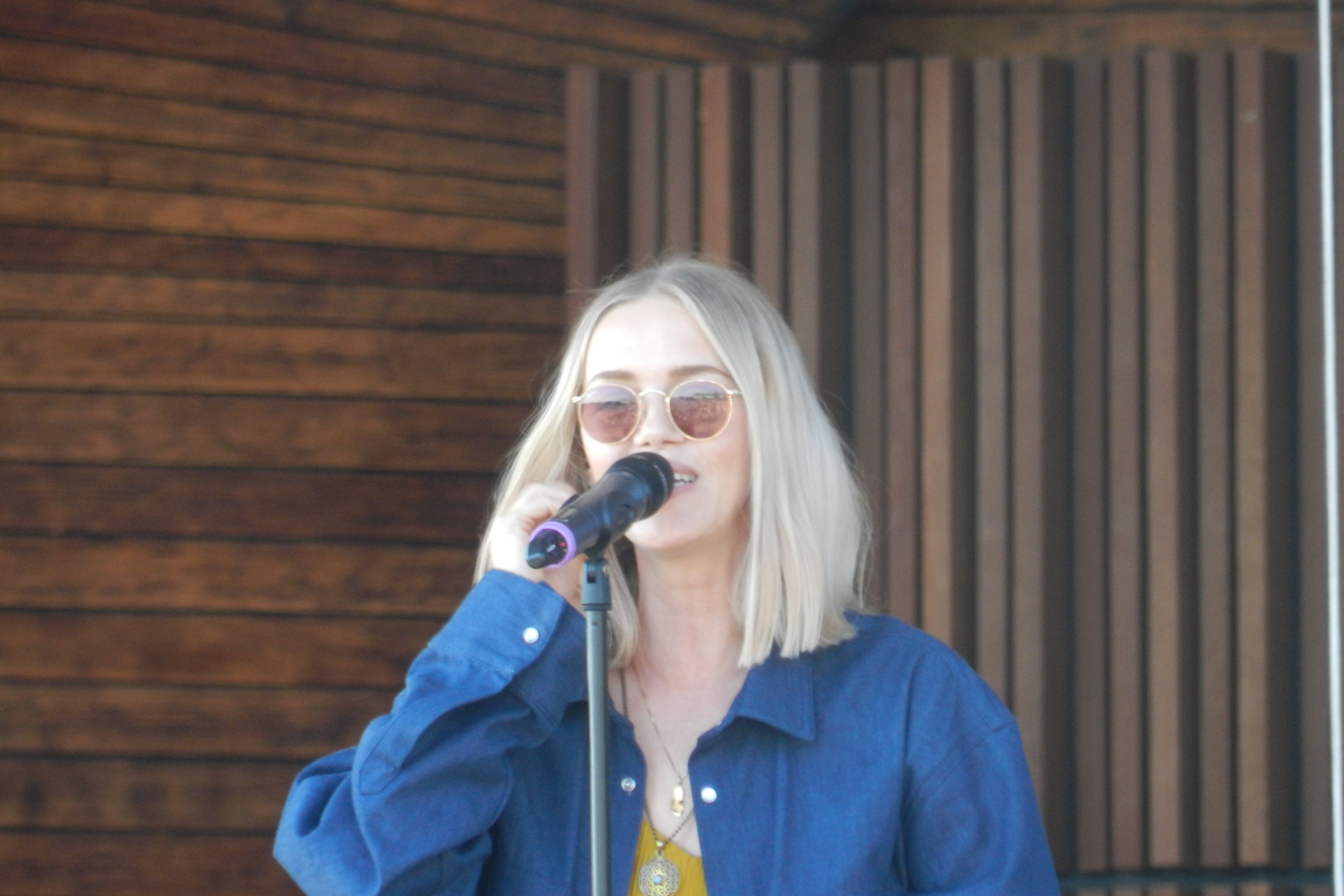
- Ana Diaz in 2018.

Background information
- Born: Ana Gabriela Esmeralda Diaz; 7 June 1977 (age 49); Västerås, Sweden
- Genres: Pop; hip hop; alternative
- Occupations: Artist, songwriter, producer
- Years active: 2012–present

Ana Gabriela Esmeralda Diaz Molina (born 7 June 1977, in Västerås) is a Swedish musician, composer, and producer.

== Biography ==
Ana Diaz grew up with a Finnish-born mother and a Venezuelan father in Bäckby, Västerås, where she early developed her interest in music. She attended music class at the Fryxellska school in Västerås. Ana's grandparents are from the Málaga province in Spain and lived as touring musicians and composers, including in Cuba together with legends such as Benny Goodman and Louis Armstrong.

In 2000, Diaz moved to the United States. After many years in Seattle and Detroit, she returned to Stockholm for a shorter period in 2004. There she studied music production in 2004–05 at Kulturama school and also participated in 2007 as an artist with the song "Waiting for Ben" on DN På stan's CD Pophopp 2007. Between 2007 and 2009, Diaz lived in Australia. After a period of much searching, odd jobs, and dealing with depression, Diaz decided to study to become a dentist. Days before she was to start studying, she was contracted as songwriter for the music publisher Sony/ATV Music Publishing. Diaz dropped out and began an intensive period as an international songwriter, in Stockholm, Nashville, London, Tokyo and Los Angeles.

Ana Diaz has collaborated with and written songs for foreign artists such as Britney Spears, One Direction, Christina Grimmie, Wyclef Jean, Markus Schultz, David Guetta, Sounwave, Rami Yacoub, Fred Ball, Jennifer Lopez, William Orbit, Astrid S, Alexandra Burke, Exo and Swedish artists such as Andreas Kleerup, Daniel Boyacioglu, Loreen, Agnes, Zara Larsson, Sabina Ddumba, Daniel Adams-Ray, Petra Marklund, Marcus Price, Oskar Linnros and Petter.

She has also written music for film and in 2015 was nominated for Roy for "Best music for commercials". Then for the song "Business like a Swede" where Ana appears rapping in English. Ana has also composed music for commercials for Vision, Volvo and Harman Kardon. Ana was one of the songwriters behind the song "Carry on" for one of Volvo's commercials with Sabina Ddumba and Andreas Kleerup . In 2018, she was part of the team behind the music for the movie Halvdan Viking, winning a Guldbagge Awards for "Best original score".

In 2015, Diaz moved back to Sweden from London after nearly 15 years abroad. After having struggled for years with anxiety, depression, she decided to pursue her own artist career with songs written for the first time in Swedish.

The single "Fill my glass now" was released on October 30, 2015. "Stronger", the second single, was released on January 25, 2016. The debut EP Lyssna del 1 was released on February 3, 2016 on their own label WINWIN Recordings with license agreement to Sony Music. On October 21, 2016, the EP Lyssna del 2 was released. In 2016, Ana Diaz collaborated with artist Abidaz on his album "Respektera hungern", on the song "Ghettofåglar".

Lyssna del 1 and Lyssna del 2 were met by very positive reviews and Ana was nominated for the P3 Guld music award in the category "Newcomer of the Year" and Grammis in the categories "Composer of the Year" and "Newcomer of the Year". Ana toured Sweden around the Way Out West festival and Popaganda.

In 2017 Neon Gold released the debut EP "EP1" with the project Snow Culture, a duo consisting of Ana Diaz and Oskar Sikow. Snow Culture was well received in American press and the music was synced to series on both Netflix and HBO.

In 2017, Ana participated in SVT's program Jills veranda. In Ana's section, topics such as mental health, sensitivity and creativity were dealt openly.

In 2017, Oskar Linnros released the song "Wifi remix", where he was guest by Ana Diaz and Jireel .

In 2018, Petter released the song "Ikväll" feat. Ana Diaz

In 2018, Ana was the artist in the music documentary Harman Kardon Reflections, where viewers could follow Ana's collaboration with producer J.Views. In the films, the two musicians traveled around in a Volvo XC40 to 3 cities in Europe (Amsterdam, Berlin and Stockholm) to explore music and the cultural scene in parallel with composing one song per city.

In 2018, Ana collaborated with Gaute Storaas and wrote music for the film Halvdan Viking. On 3 January 2019, it was announced that the film music had become Guldbagge-nominated.

In 2020, Ana was cast for the 11th season of the Swedish TV show Så mycket bättre, during the first week she performed a cover of "Vår lilla stad" by Eldkvarn.

== Discography ==
=== Albums ===
Title	Year	Peak chart positions	Certifications
Title	Year	SWE	Certifications
Lyssna del 1	2016	47	
Lyssna del 2	2016	—	
Tröst och vatten	2020	8	GLF: Gold
Så mycket bättre 2020 – Tolkningarna	2020	5	

=== Singles ===
Title	Year	Peak chart positions	Certifications	Album
Title	Year	SWE	Certifications	Album
"Fyll upp mitt glas nu"	2015	— (Note: "Fyll upp mitt glas nu" did not enter the Swedish Singles Chart, but peaked at number nine on the Swedish Heatseeker chart.)		Lyssna del 1
"Starkare"	2016	— (Note: "Starkare" did not enter the Swedish Singles Chart, but peaked at number nine on the Swedish Heatseeker chart.)	GLF: Gold	Lyssna del 1
"Nästan där"	2016	—		Lyssna del 2
"Det var du"	2016	—		Lyssna del 2
"100"	2019	15	GLF: Platinum	Tröst och vatten
"Allt e lättare på sommarn" (featuring Parham)	2019	—		Tröst och vatten
"Bättre sen"	2019	—		Tröst och vatten
"Bästis"	2020	— (Note: "Bästis" did not enter the Swedish Singles Chart, but peaked at number five on the Swedish Heatseeker chart.)		Tröst och vatten
"Vår lilla stad"	2020	48		Så mycket bättre 2020 – Tolkningarna
"Askan är den bästa jorden"	2020	75		Så mycket bättre 2020 – Tolkningarna
"Fait accompli"	2020	86		Så mycket bättre 2020 – Tolkningarna
"Regnet"	2020	94		Så mycket bättre 2020 – Tolkningarna
"Vara vänner"	2020	76		Så mycket bättre 2020 – Tolkningarna
"Vikommerådö"	2021	— (Note: "Vikommerådö" did not enter the Swedish Singellista Chart, but peaked at number three on the Swedish Heatseeker Chart.)		Non-album single

=== Other charted songs ===
Title	Year	Peak chart positions	Album
Title	Year	SWE	Album
"Det fina med tid"	2023	83	Tröst och vatten
