= List of songs recorded by Britney Spears =

Songs by American singer

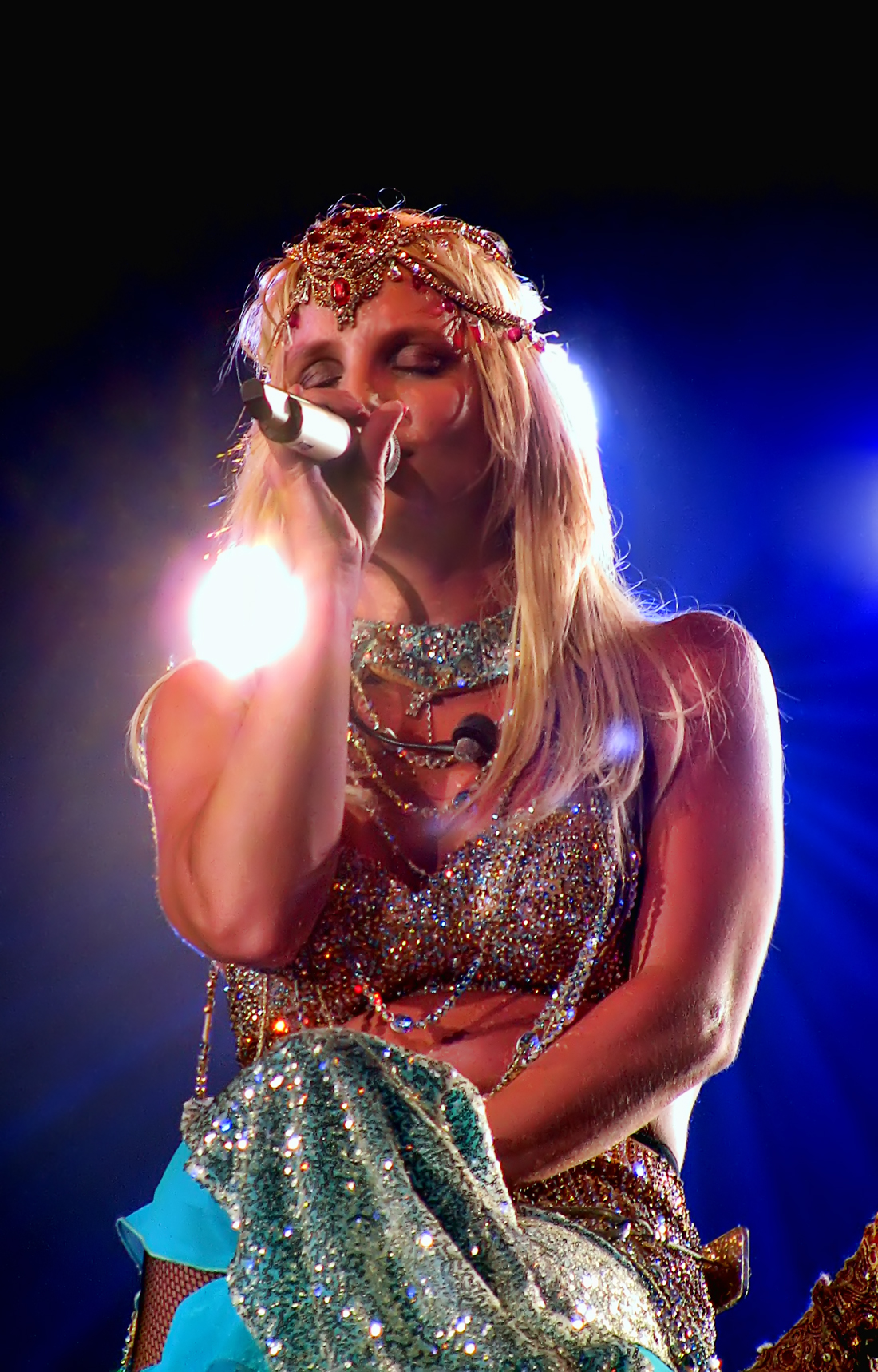
Spears performing "Everytime" on the Circus Starring Britney Spears, 2009

American singer Britney Spears made her chart debut in November 1998 with "...Baby One More Time", which attained global success. It was followed by the release of her debut studio album ...Baby One More Time (1999), which debuted at number one on the Canadian Albums Chart and the US Billboard 200, and was later certified fourteen-times platinum by the Recording Industry Association of America (RIAA). Spears's second studio album, Oops!... I Did It Again, was released on May 16, 2000, and became the fastest-selling album by a female act in the US, selling 1,319,193 units in its opening week. It spawned the singles "Oops!... I Did It Again", "Lucky", "Stronger", and "Don't Let Me Be the Last to Know". In November 2001, Spears released "I'm a Slave 4 U", the lead single from her self-titled third studio album (2001). In November 2003, Spears's fourth studio album, In the Zone, was released. The album includes "Me Against the Music", a collaboration with Madonna that reached number one on the European Hot 100 Singles, and "Toxic", which earned Spears her first Grammy Award in the category Best Dance Recording. Her first compilation album, Greatest Hits: My Prerogative, was released the following year.

Following her personal struggles through 2007, Spears's fifth studio album, Blackout, was released in October of the same year. The album sold over three million units worldwide, spawning the hit singles "Gimme More" and "Piece of Me". With the release of her sixth studio album Circus (2008), Spears became the only act in the Nielsen SoundScan era (1991–present) to have four albums debut with US sales of 500,000 or more copies. Including the singles "Womanizer" and "Circus", it sold four million copies worldwide.

Spears's third compilation album, The Singles Collection (2009), includes her third US number-one single "3". In 2011, Spears released the single "Hold It Against Me", making her the second artist in the Billboard Hot 100 chart's 52-year history to debut at number one with two or more songs, after Mariah Carey. The track was included on her seventh studio album Femme Fatale (2011), which debuted at number one on the US Billboard 200. Spears's eighth studio album, Britney Jean, was released in 2013; it made little commercial impact and received mixed reviews from critics but spawned the hit single "Work Bitch", which was certified platinum in the United States. Glory, the ninth studio album from Spears, was released in August 2016 to critical praise and chart success but failed to reach the success of her other albums.

Spears has sold over 150 million records worldwide and more than 36.9 million digital singles in the US alone, making her one of the best-selling music artists of all time. Billboard ranked her as the eighth-overall Artist of the Decade; it also recognized her as the best-selling female album artist of the first decade of the 21st century and the fifth overall. The RIAA also recognized Spears as the ninth top-selling female artist in the US, with 38.5 million certified albums. Spears is among the few artists in history to have had a number-one single and a number-one album in each of the three decades of their career (1990s, 2000s, and 2010s).

== Songs ==
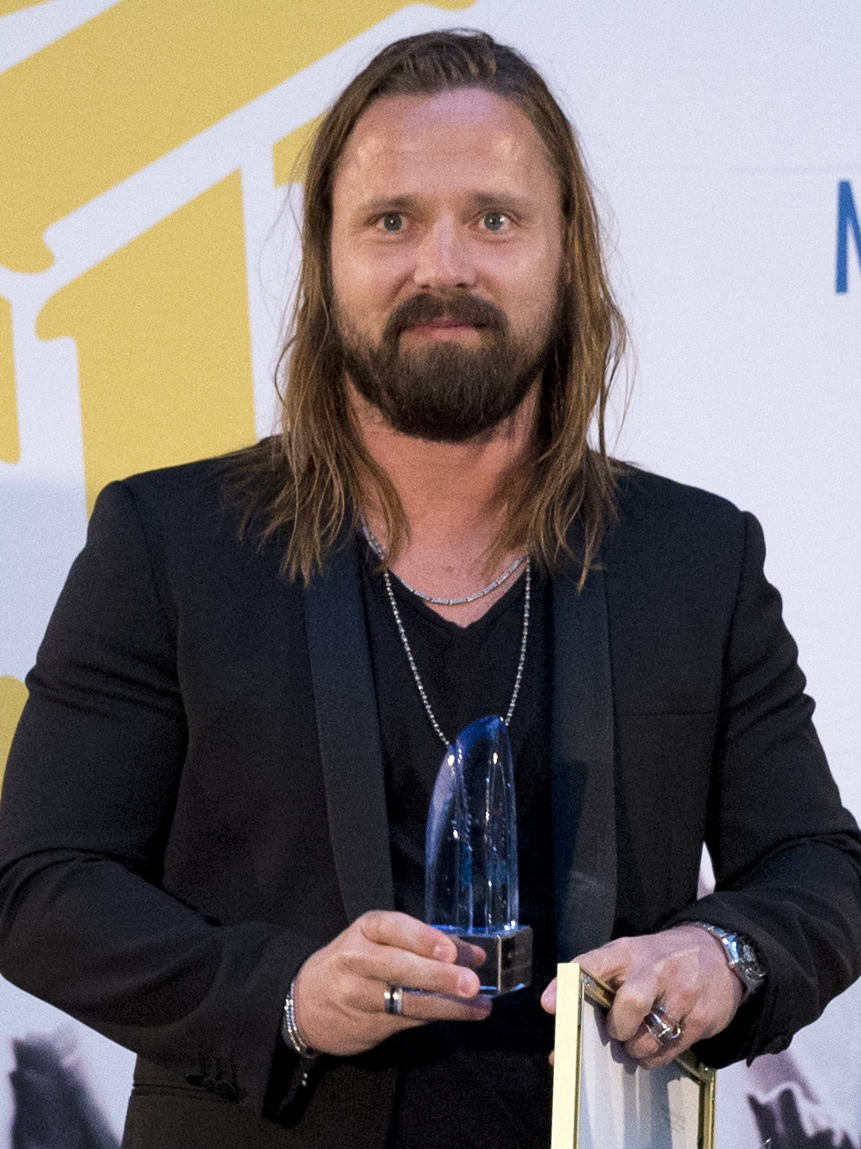
Max Martin has written many songs performed by Spears.

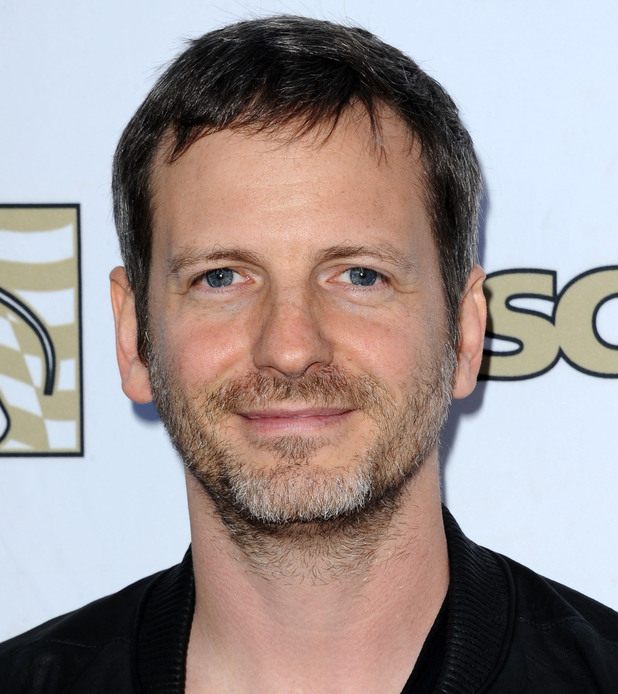
Dr. Luke has co-written ten songs performed by Spears, including "Circus".

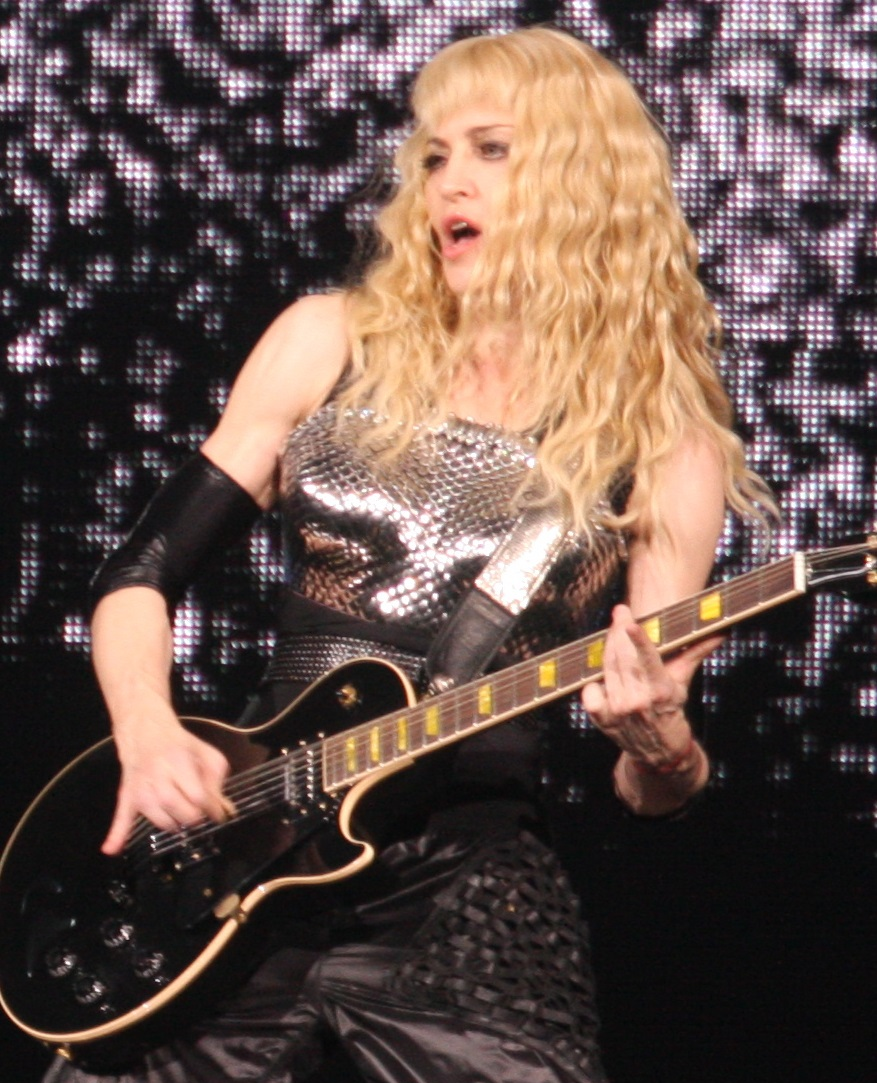
Madonna is featured on "Me Against the Music".

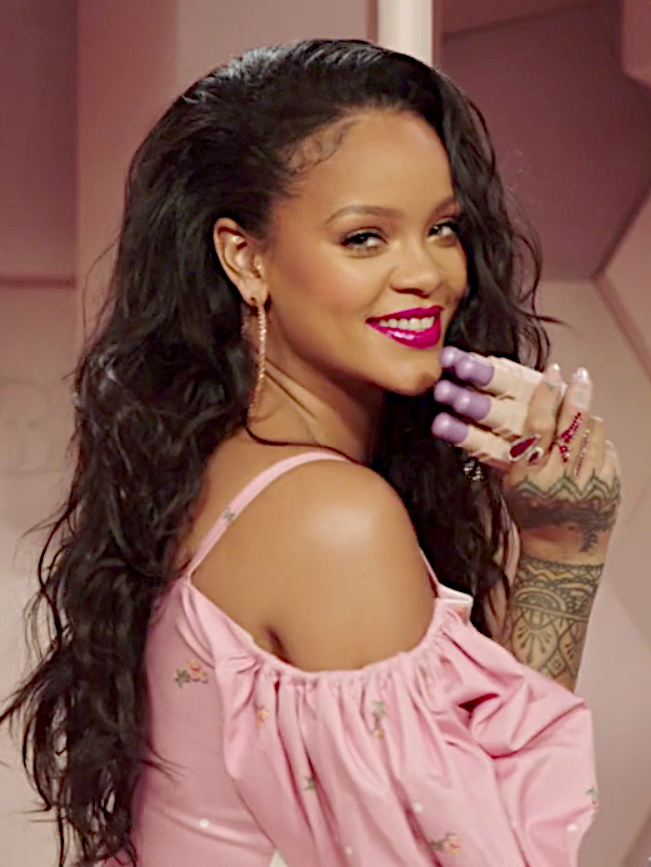
Spears is featured on a remix of Rihanna's "S&M".

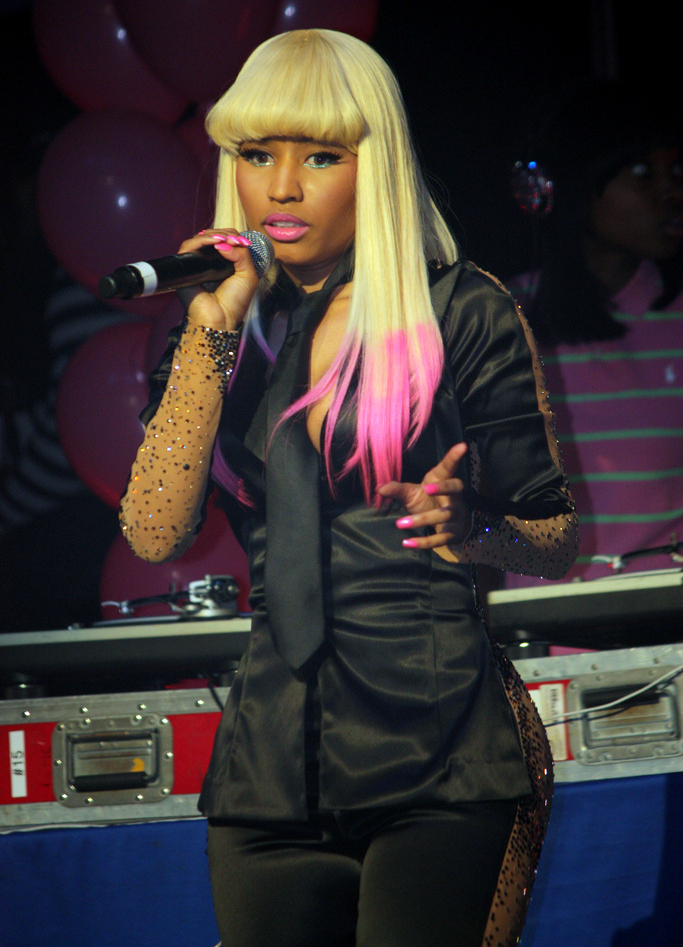
Nicki Minaj lent her vocals to the remix of "Till the World Ends".

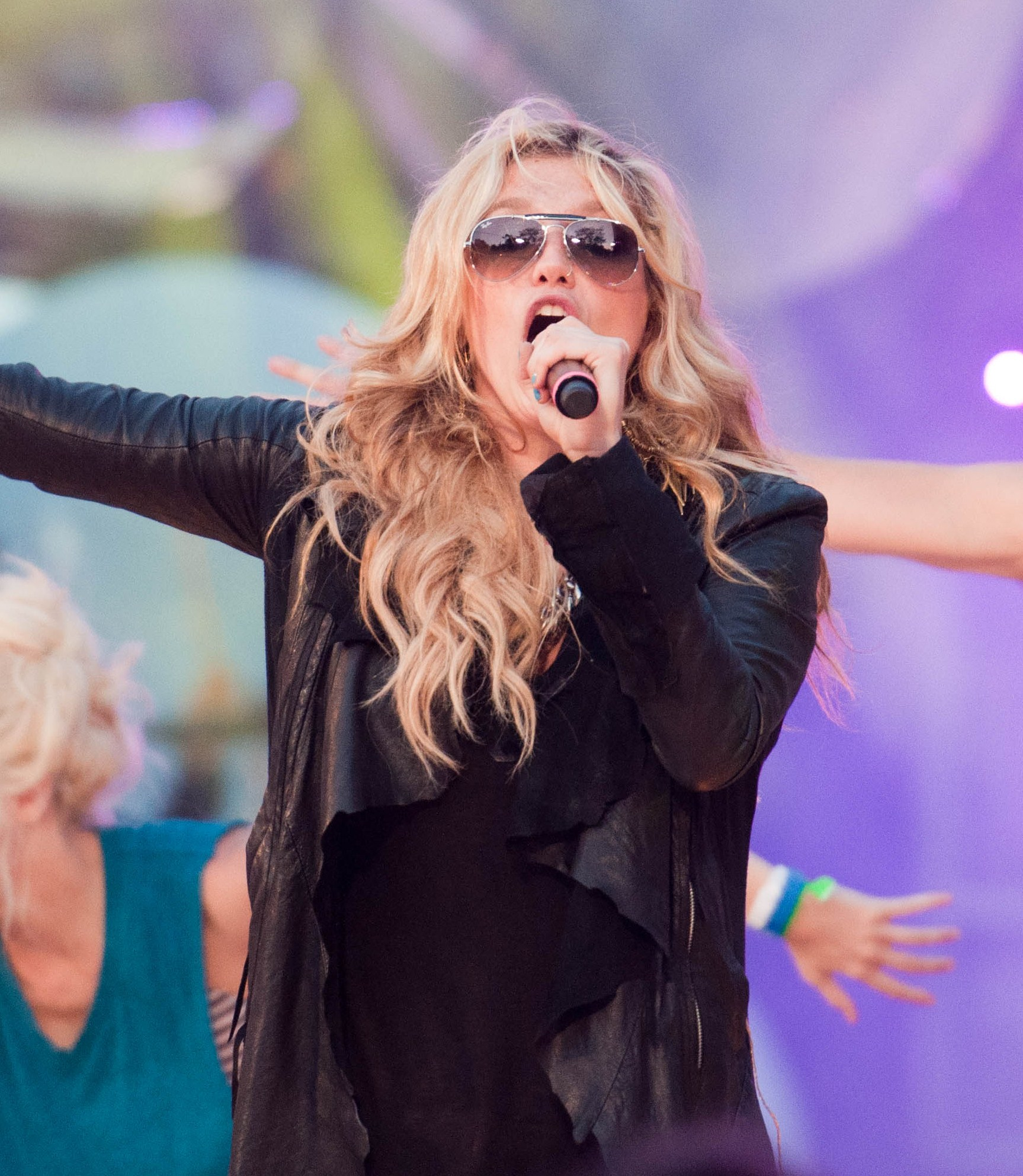
Kesha co-wrote "Till the World Ends".

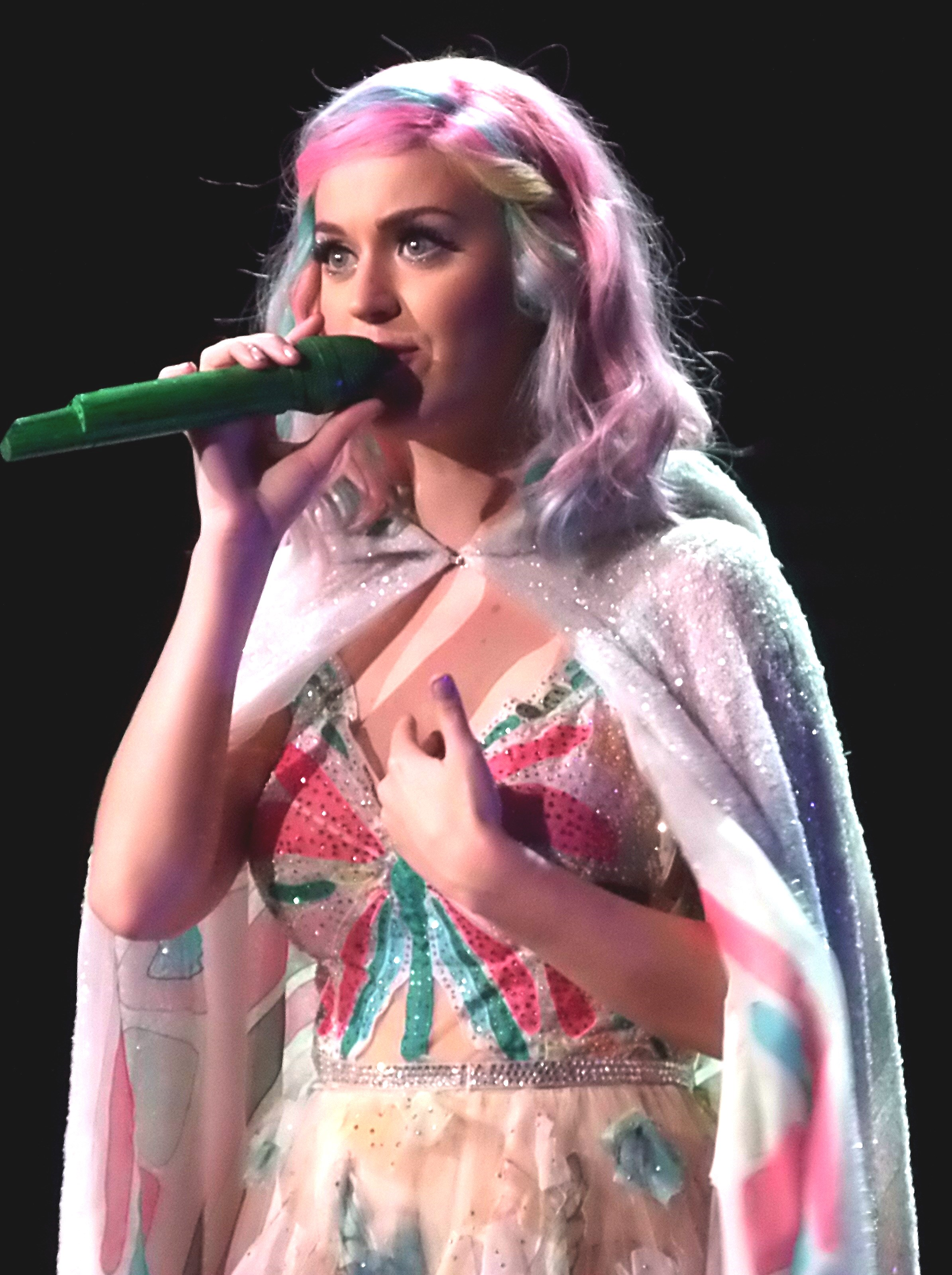
"Passenger" from Britney Jean was co-written by Katy Perry.

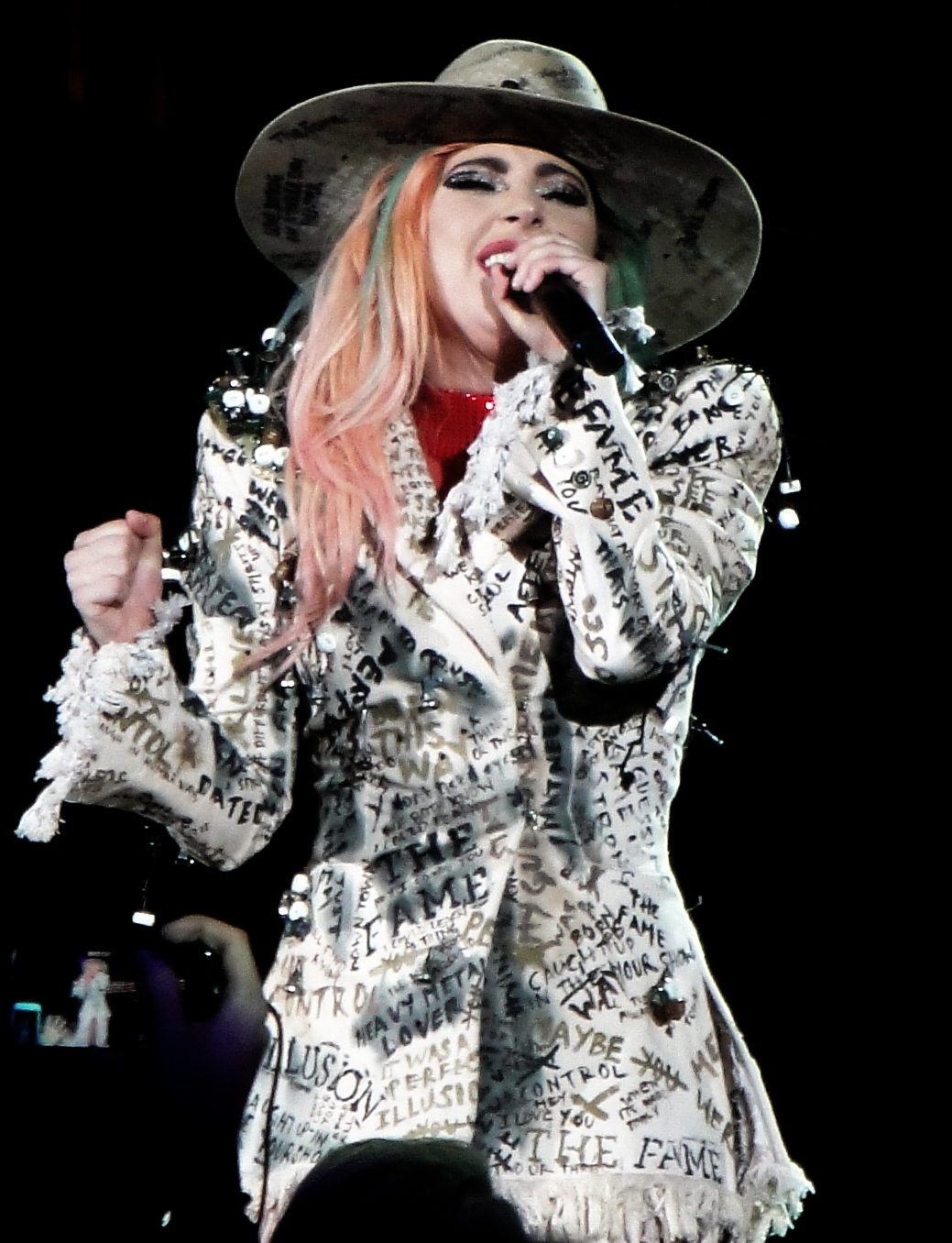
Lady Gaga co-wrote "Quicksand" from Circus.

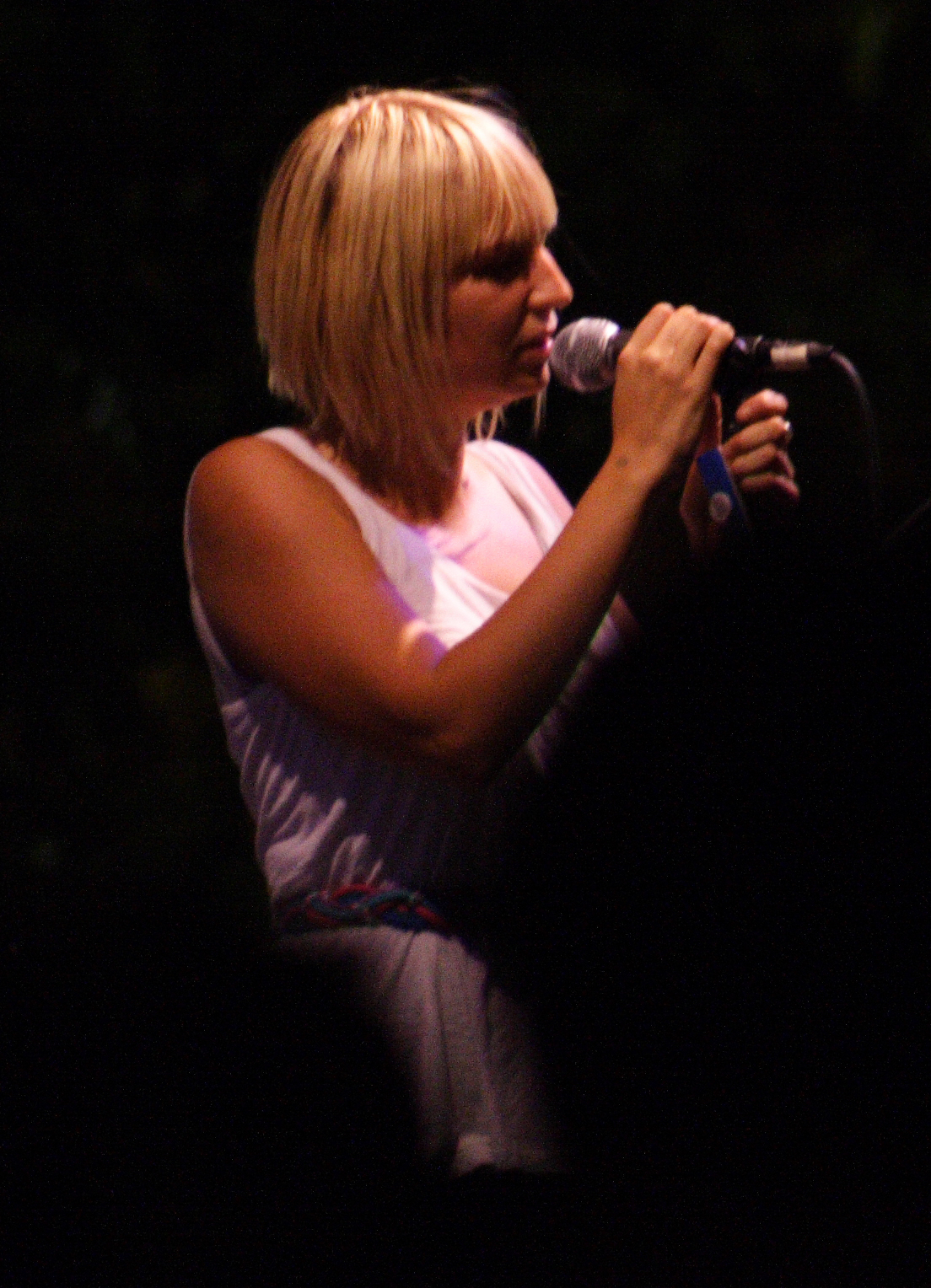
Sia co-wrote "Perfume", "Passenger", and "Brightest Morning Star" from Britney Jean.

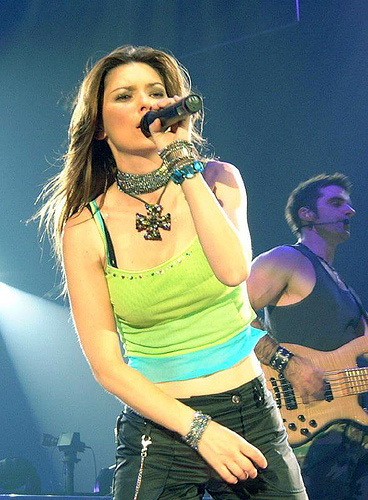
"Don't Let Me Be the Last to Know" was co-written by Shania Twain.

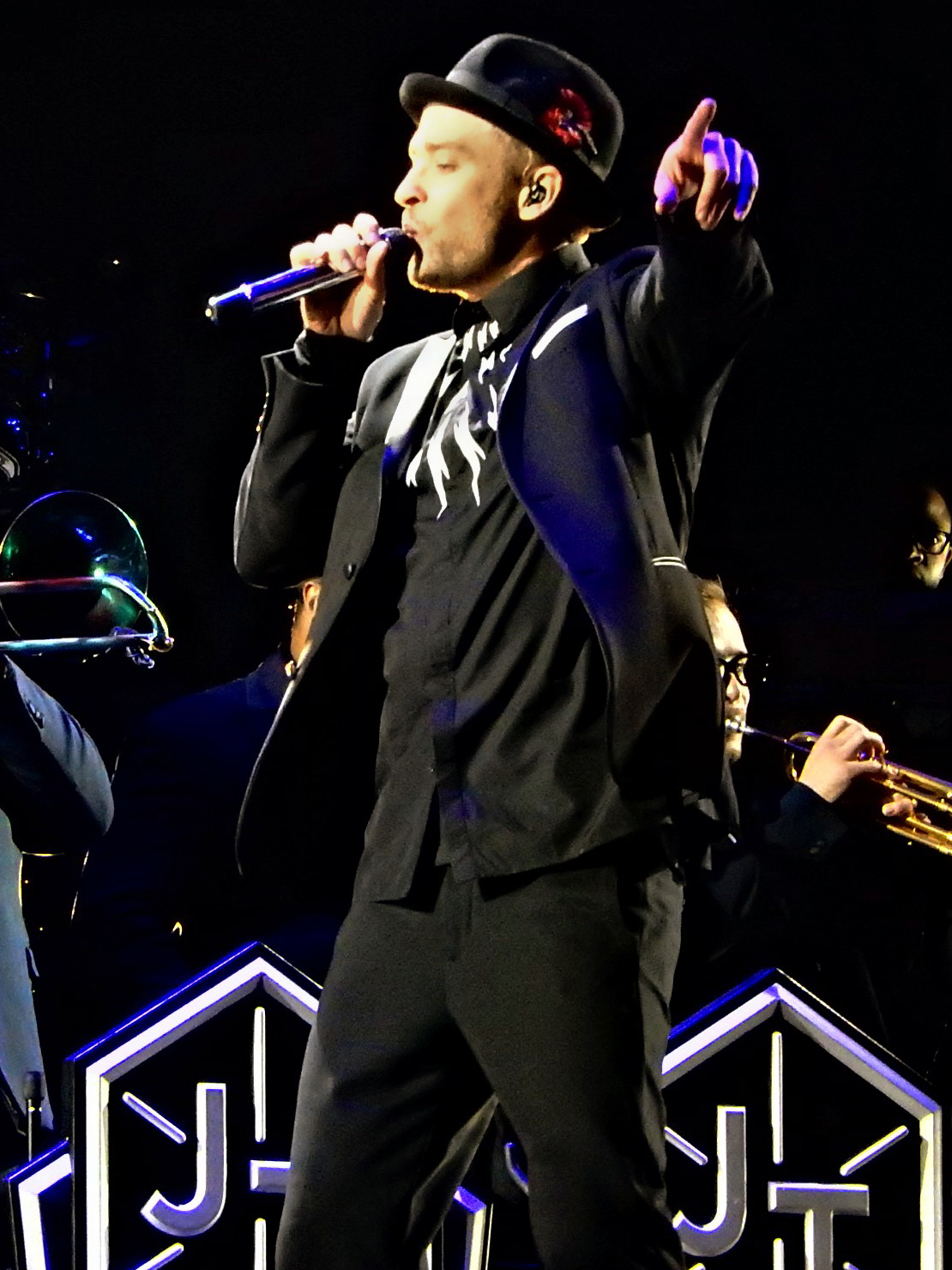
"What It's Like to Be Me" from Britney was co-written by Justin Timberlake.

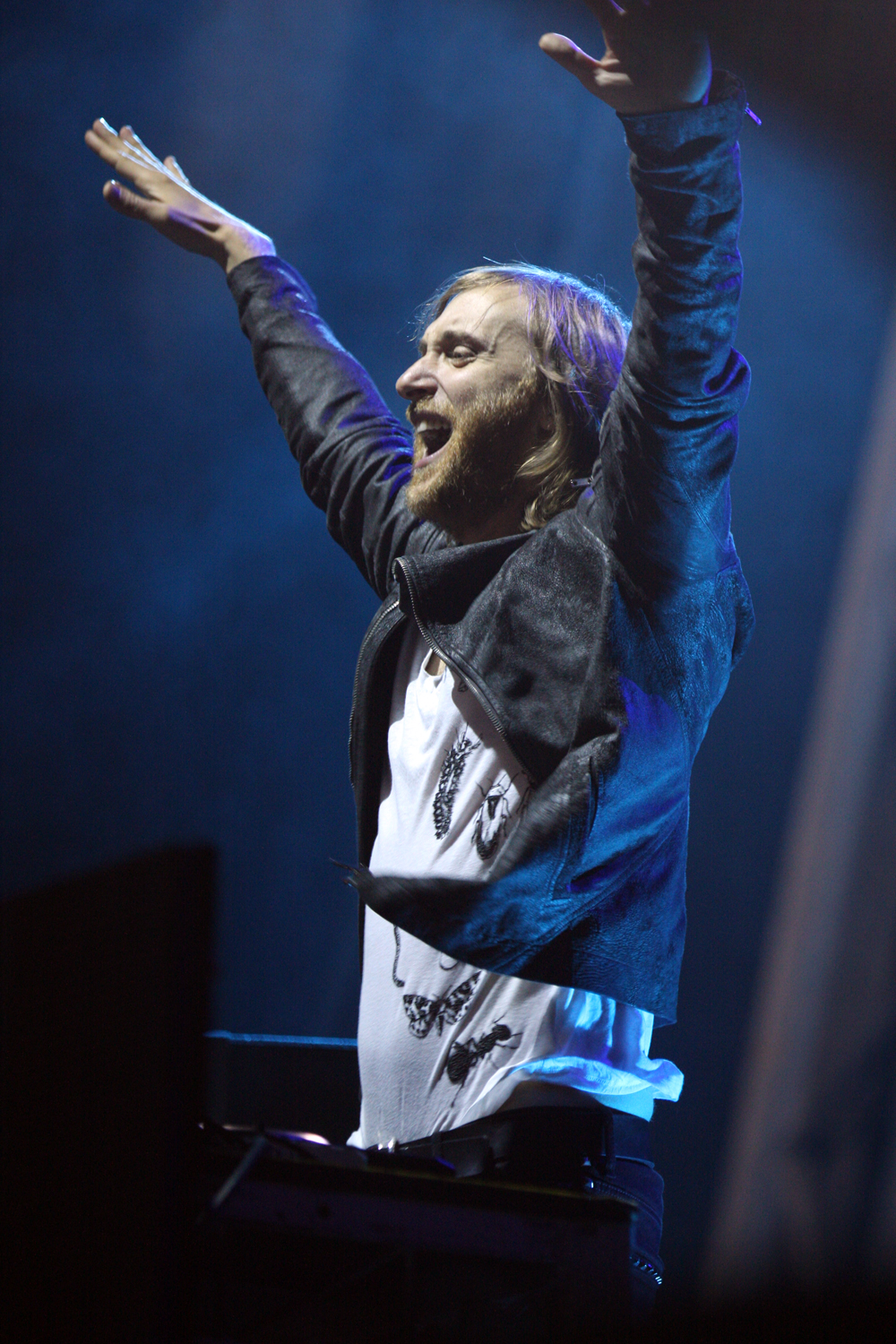
David Guetta co-wrote "Body Ache" and "It Should Be Easy" from Britney Jean.

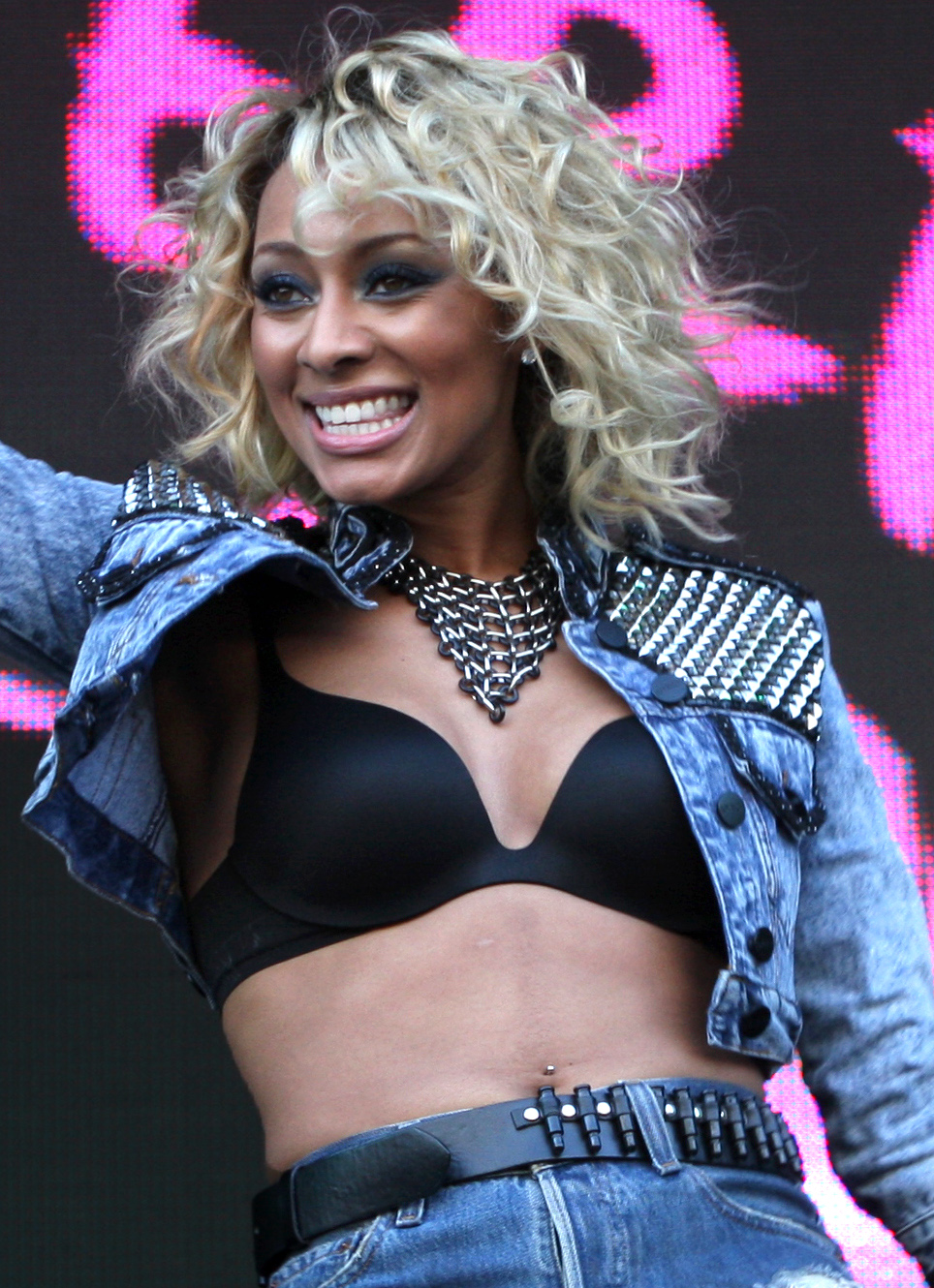
Keri Hilson co-wrote four songs from Blackout, including "Gimme More" and "Break the Ice".

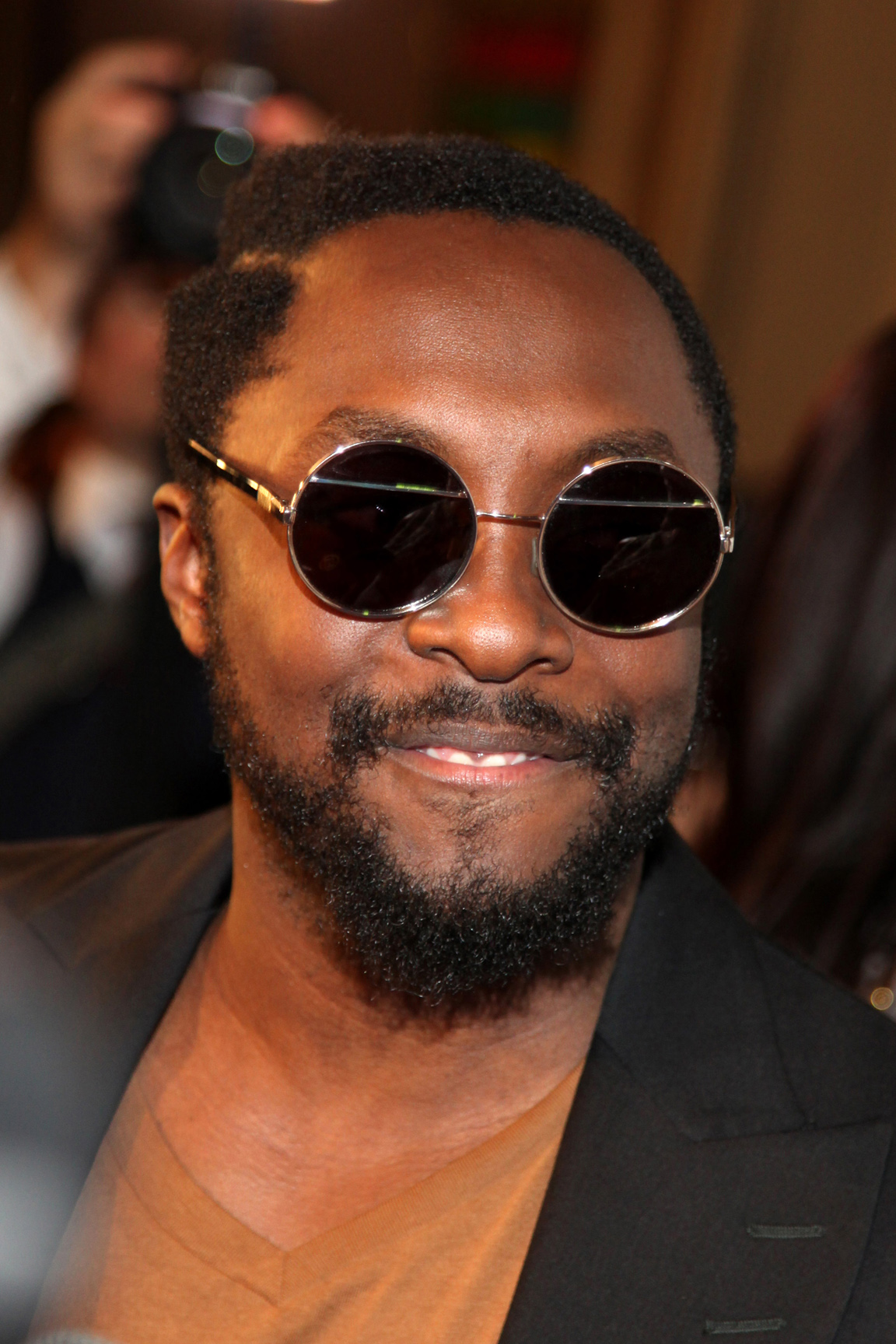
will.i.am is featured on Spears's "Big Fat Bass" and "It Should Be Easy", and Spears is featured on will.i.am's "Scream & Shout". He is executive producer on Spears's eighth album Britney Jean.

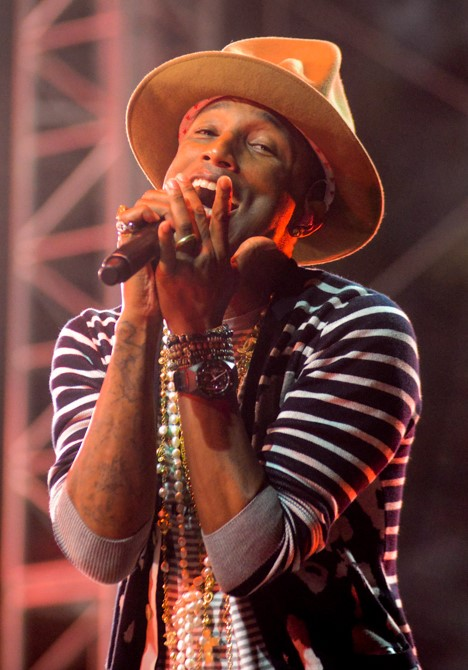
Pharrell Williams co-wrote "I'm a Slave 4 U" and "Boys".

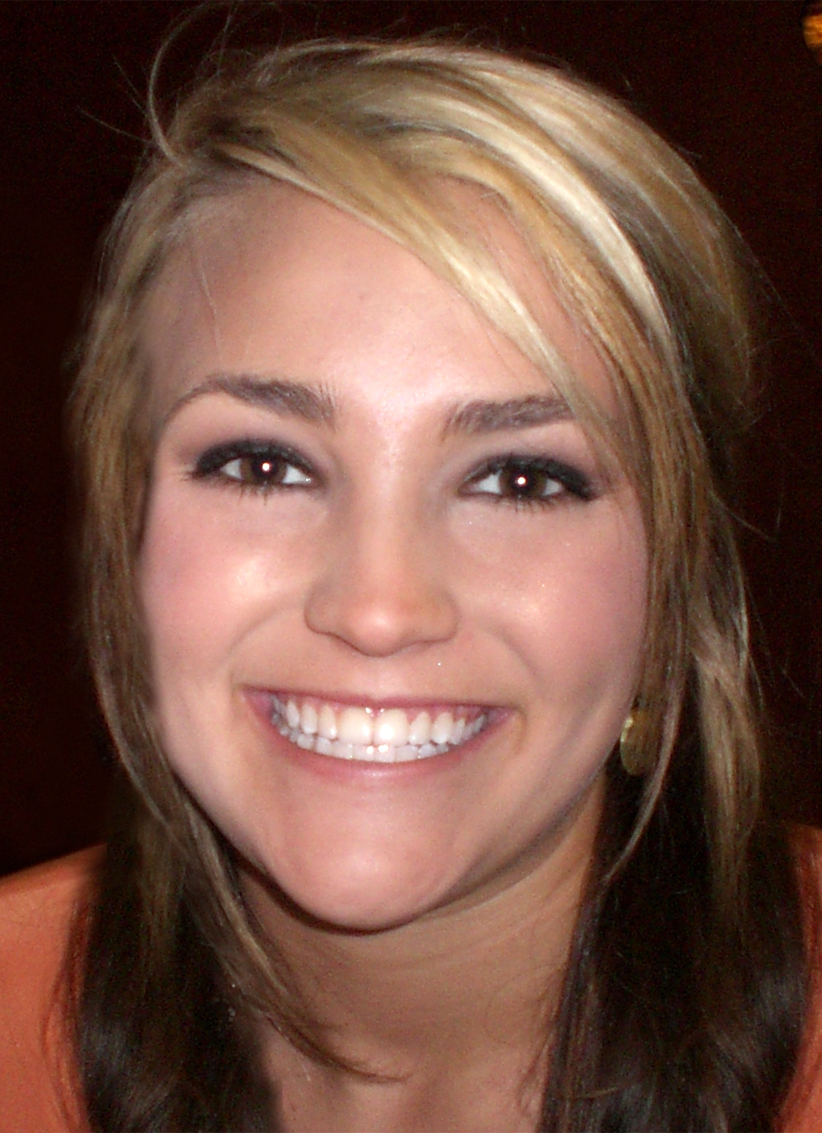
"Chillin' with You" features her sister Jamie Lynn Spears.

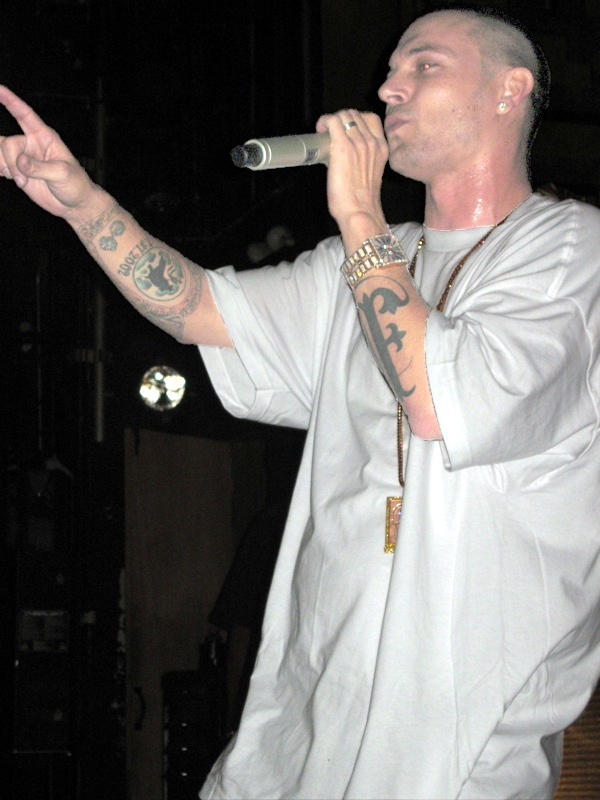
"Crazy" was performed by Kevin Federline featuring Spears.

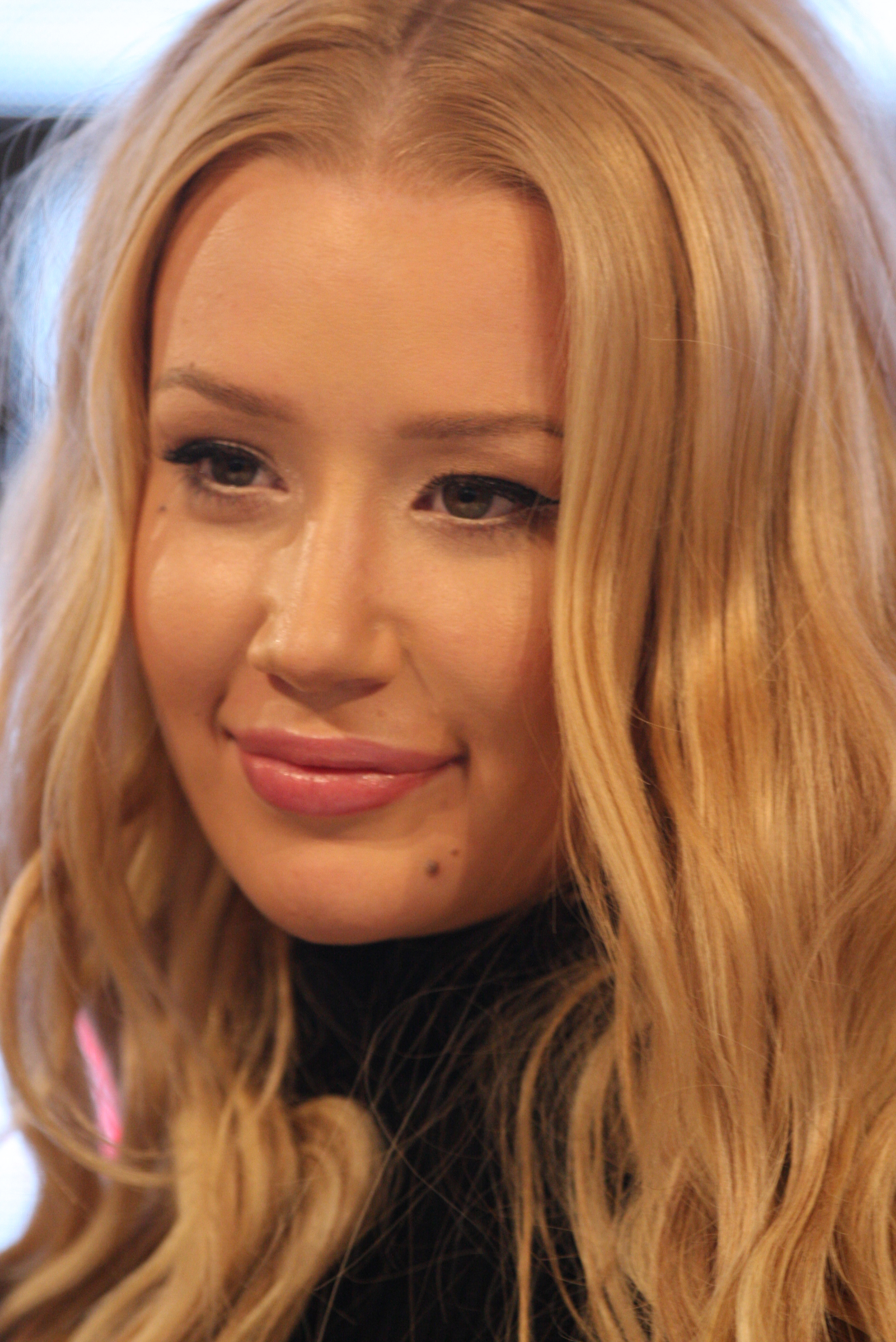
Iggy Azalea collaborated with Spears on "Pretty Girls".

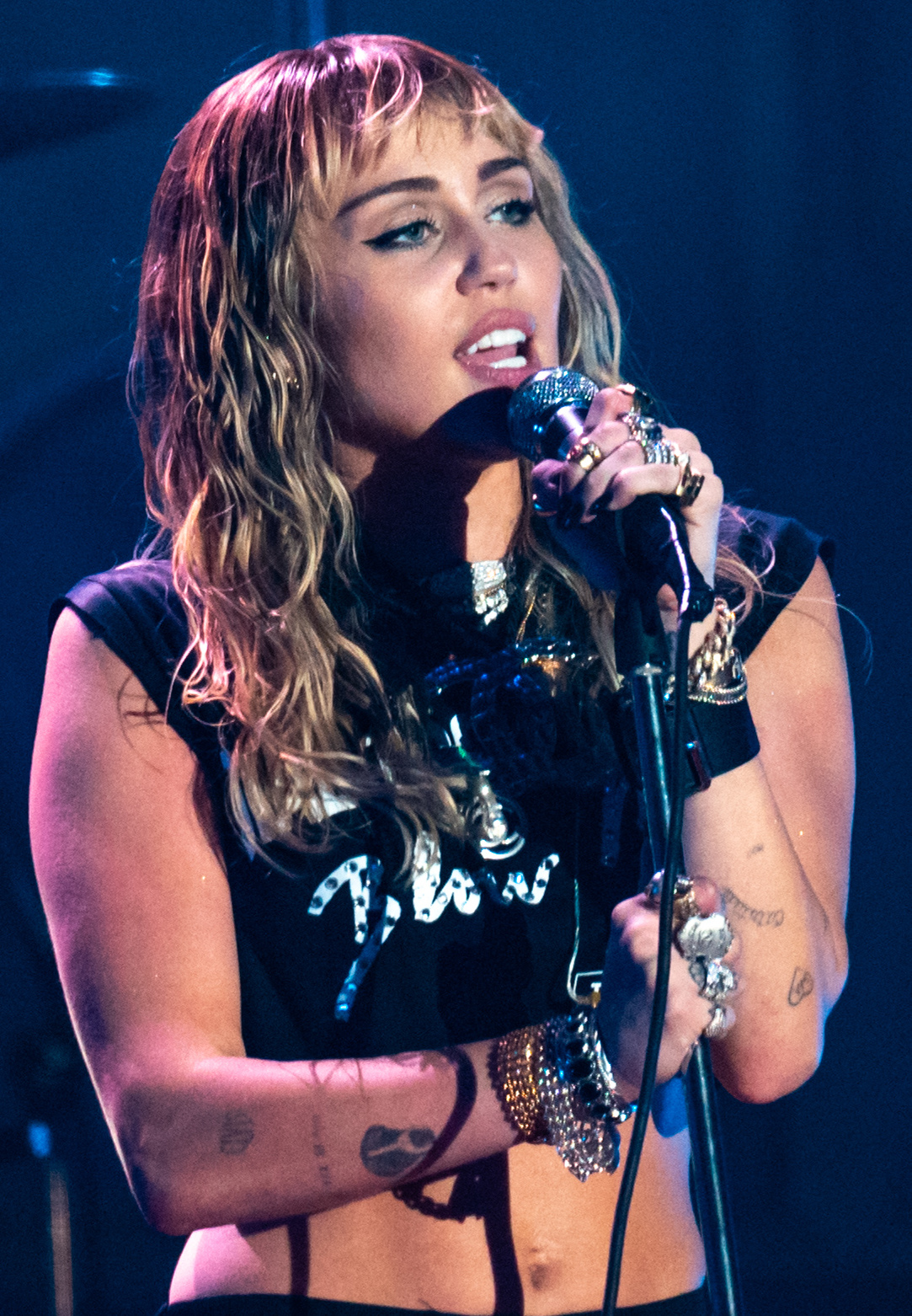
Spears is featured in Miley Cyrus's "SMS (Bangerz)".

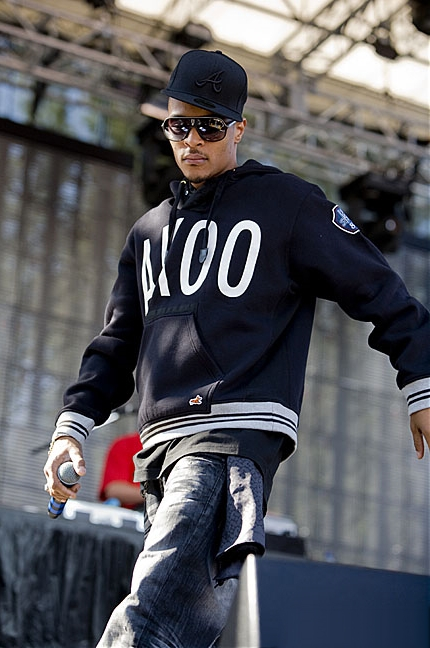
"Tik Tik Boom" features American rapper T.I.

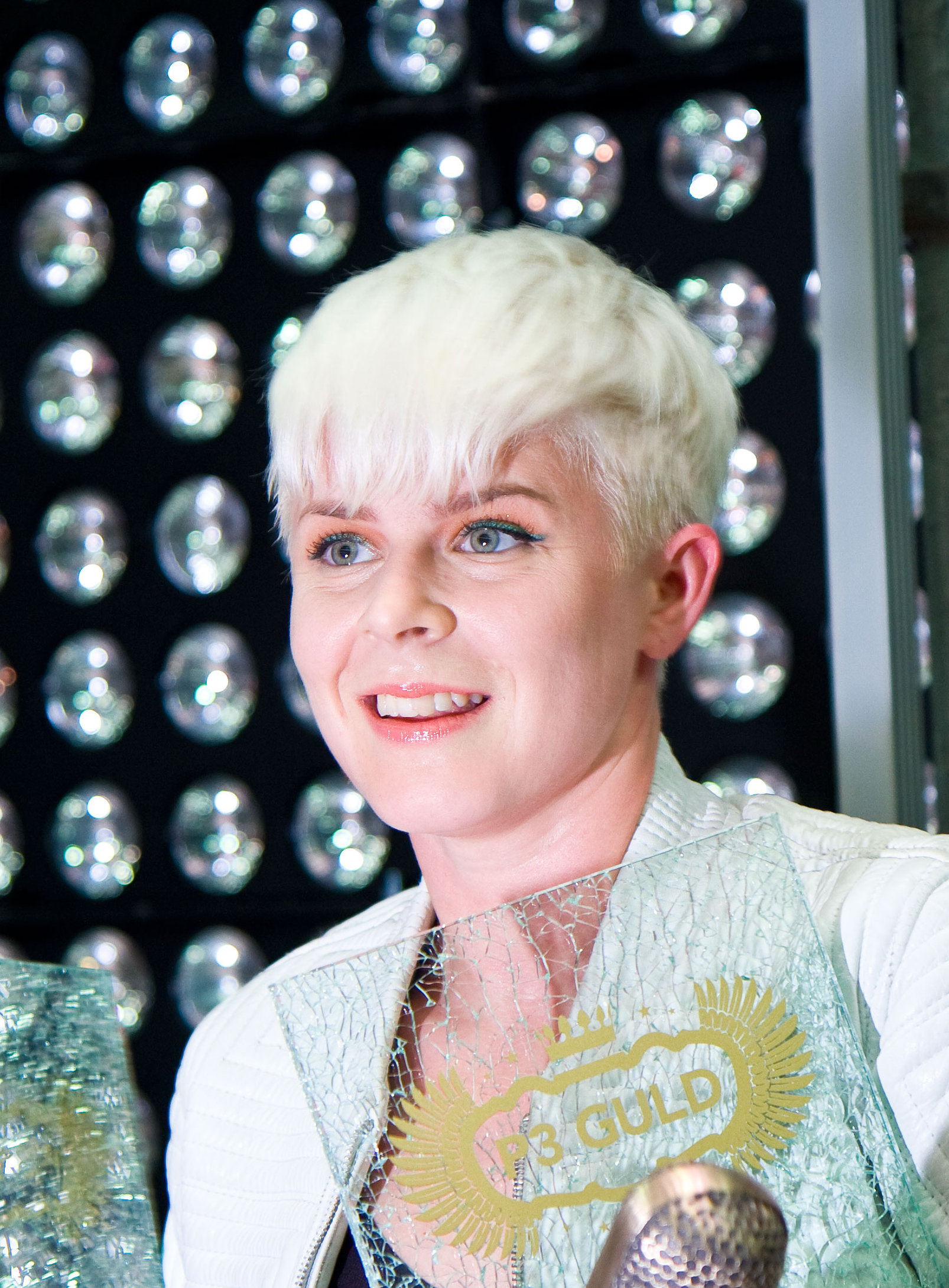
Robyn co-wrote "Over to You Now" from Britney & Kevin: Chaotic and she provided backing vocals on "Piece of Me" from Blackout.

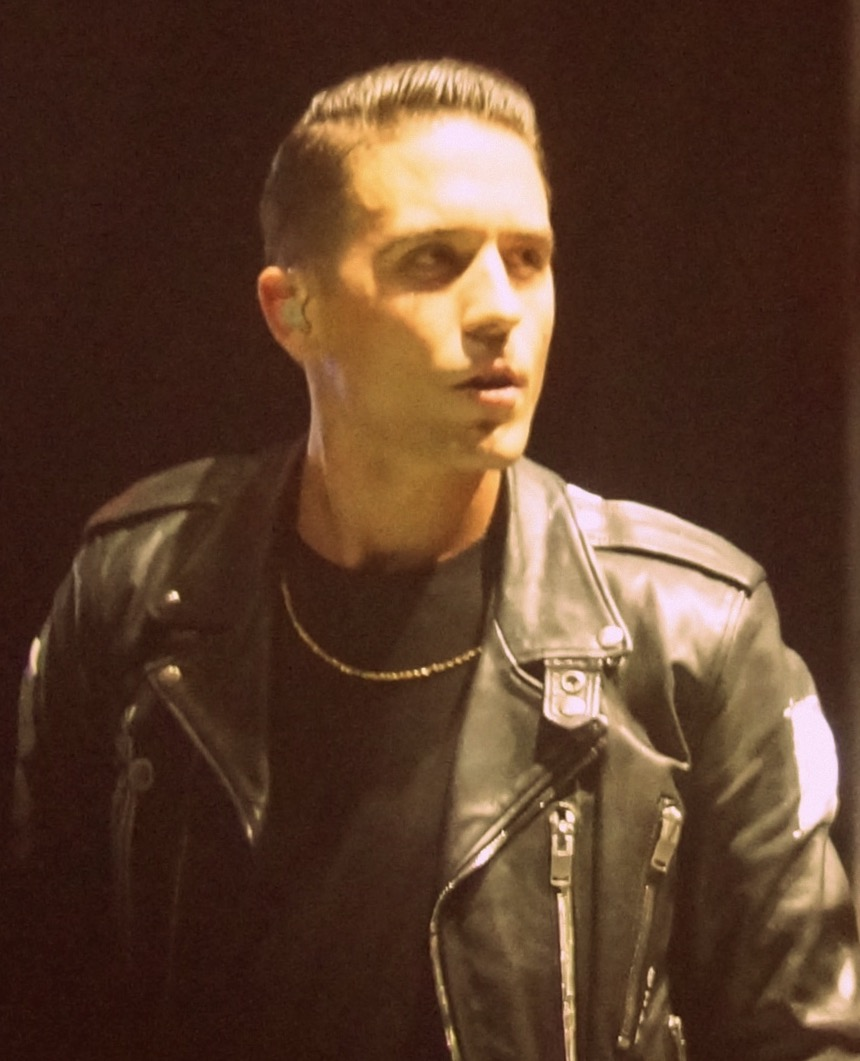
"Make Me..." features American rapper G-Eazy.

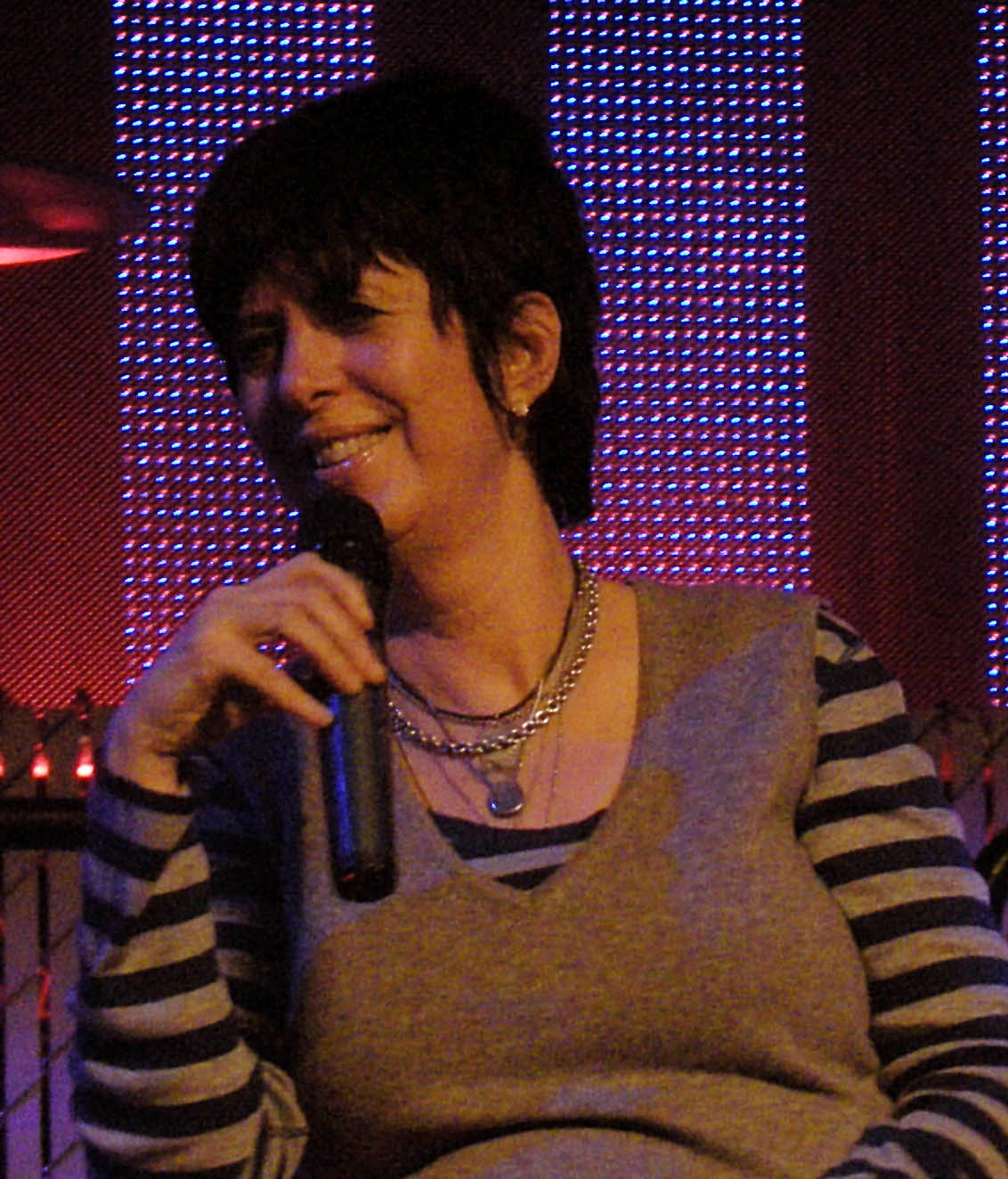
Diane Warren wrote "When Your Eyes Say It" from Oops!... I Did It Again.

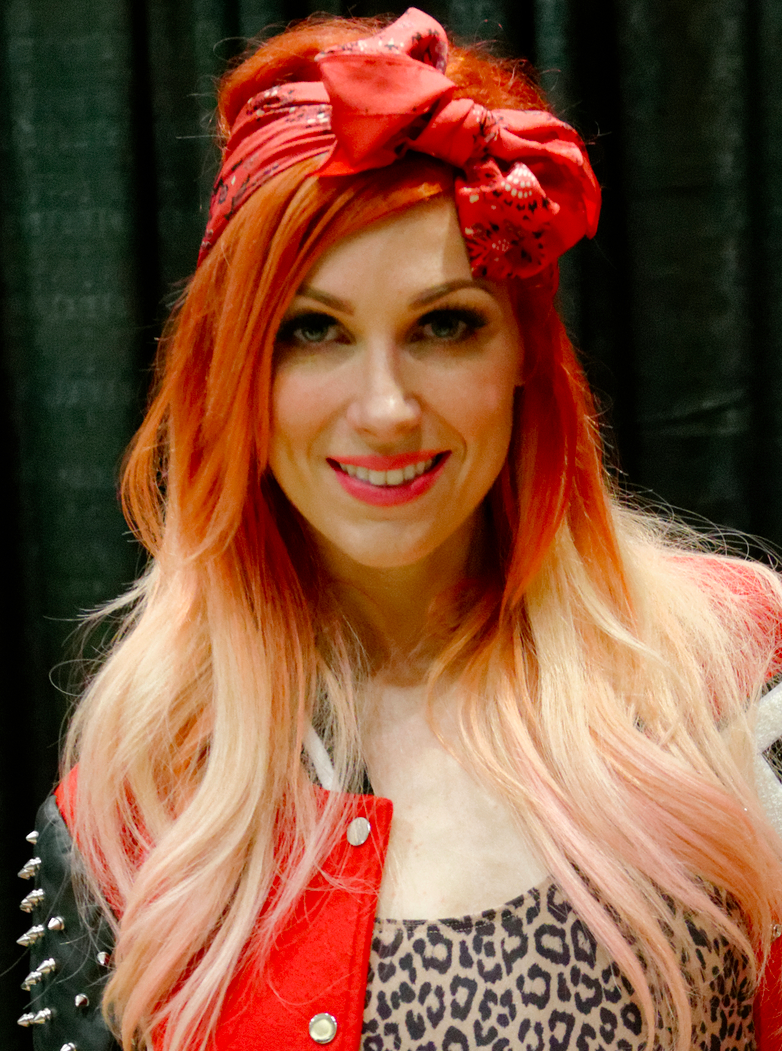
Bonnie McKee co-wrote four songs from Femme Fatale, including "Hold It Against Me".

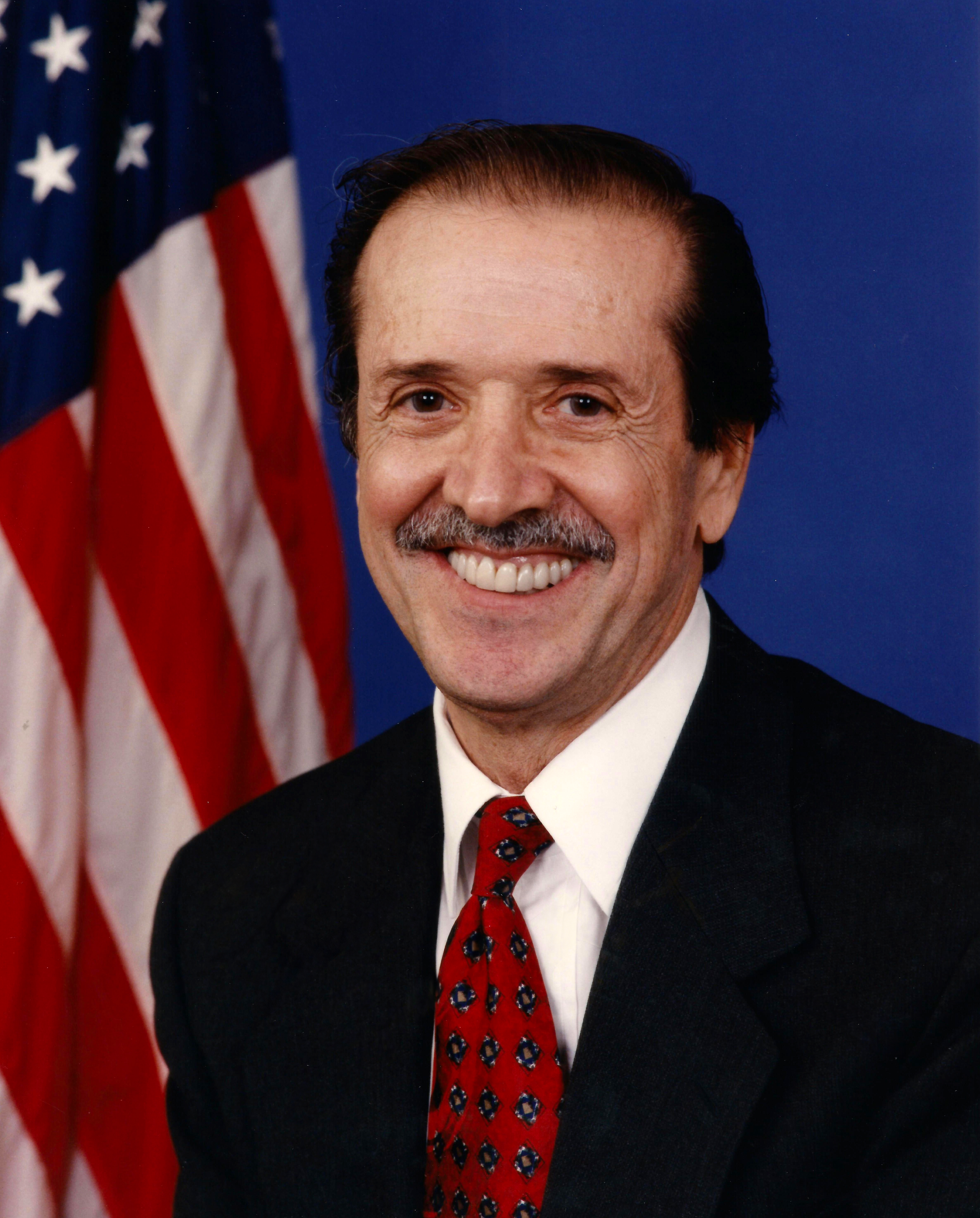
Spears covered "The Beat Goes On", which was co-written by Sonny Bono.

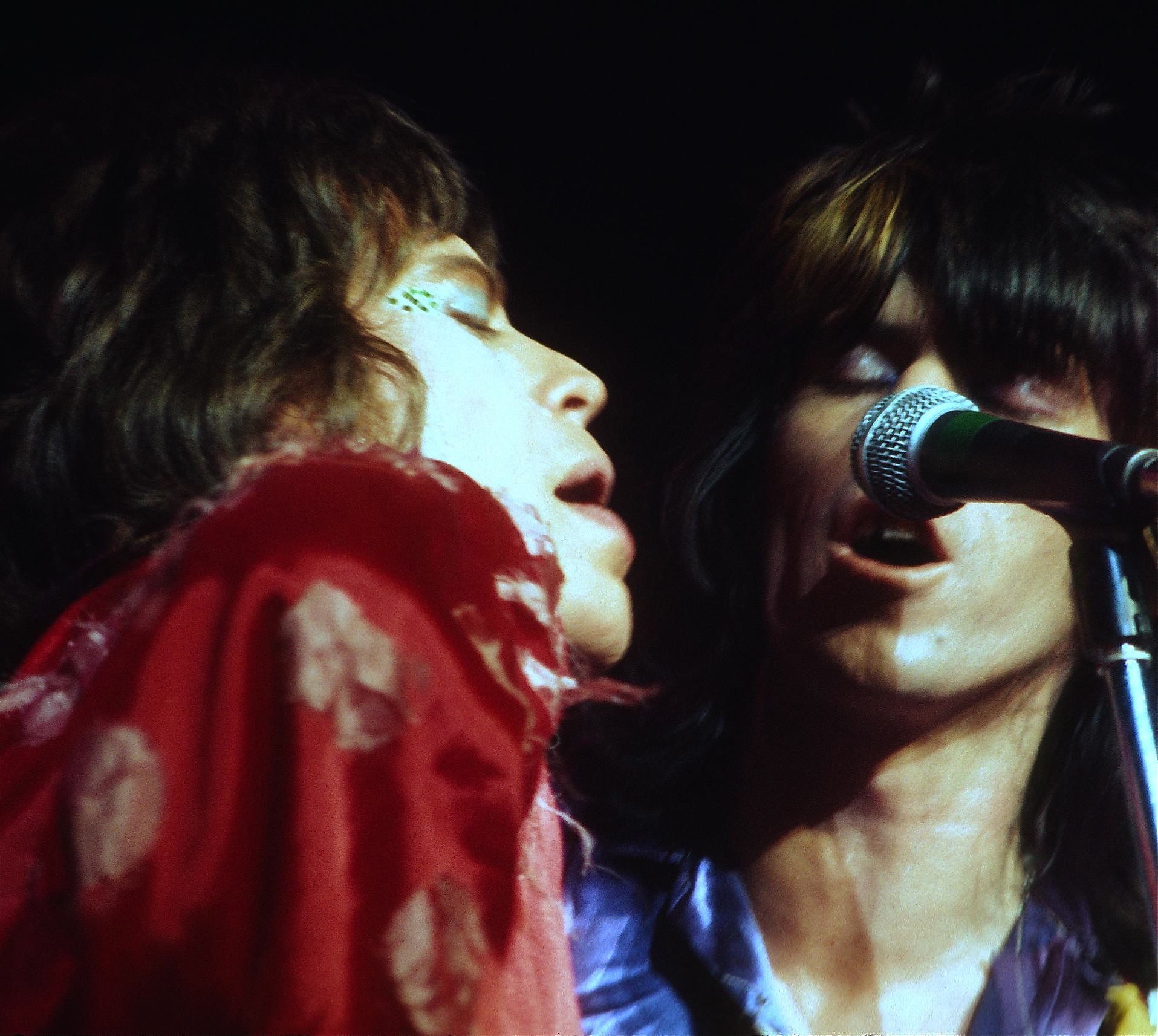
Spears covered "(I Can't Get No) Satisfaction", written by Mick Jagger (left) and Keith Richards (right).

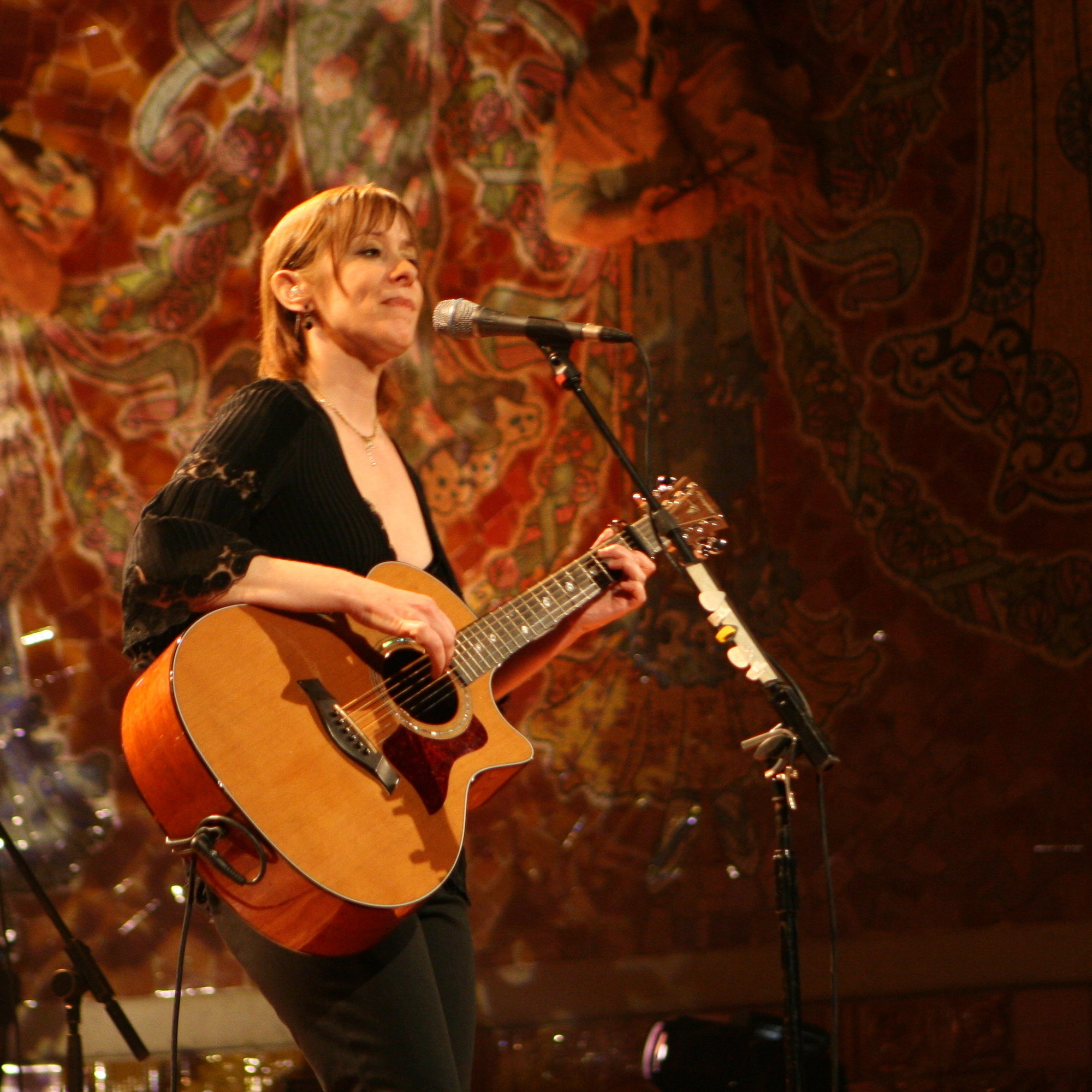
Spears covered "Tom's Diner" by Suzanne Vega.

Key
‡	Indicates song included on an alternative version of the album
≠	Indicates songs covered by Britney Spears

Name of song featured performers, writers, originating album, and year released
Song	Writer(s)	Album	Year	Ref.
"3"	Max Martin; Karl Schuster; Tiffany Amber	The Singles Collection	2009	
"Alien"	Britney Spears; Ana Diaz; Anthony Preston; Dan Trynor; William Orbit	Britney Jean	2013	
"Amnesia"	Fernando Garibay; Kasia Livingston	Circus ‡	2008	
"And Then We Kiss"	Britney Spears; Mark Taylor; Paul Barry	B in the Mix: The Remixes	2005	
"The Answer"	Ryan Leslie; Sean Combs	In the Zone ‡	2003	
"Anticipating"	Britney Spears; Josh Schwartz; Brian Kierulf	Britney	2001	
"Autumn Goodbye"	Eric Foster White	...Baby One More Time ‡	1999	
"...Baby One More Time"	Max Martin	...Baby One More Time	1998	
"The Beat Goes On" ≠	Sonny Bono; Eric Foster White	...Baby One More Time	1999	
"Before the Goodbye"	Britney Spears; Brian Transeau; Josh Schwartz; Brian Kierulf	Britney ‡	2001	
"Better"	Britney Spears; Julia Michaels; Justin Tranter; Michael Tucker	Glory ‡	2016	
"Big Fat Bass" featuring will.i.am	William Adams	Femme Fatale	2011	
"Blur"	Nathaniel Hills; Stacy Barthe; Marcella Araica	Circus	2008	
"Body Ache"	Britney Spears; David Guetta; Giorgio Tuinfort; Luciana Caporaso; Nick Clow; Myah Marie Langston; Anthony Preston; Richard Gonzalez; Jose Luna	Britney Jean	2013	
"Bombastic Love"	Max Martin; Rami Yacoub	Britney	2001	
"Born to Make You Happy"	Kristian Lundin; Andreas Carlsson	...Baby One More Time	1999	
"Boys"	Chad Hugo; Pharrell Williams	Britney	2001	
"Brave New Girl"	Britney Spears; Brian Kierulf; Josh Schwartz; Kara DioGuardi	In the Zone	2003	
"Break the Ice"	Nathaniel Hills; James Washington; Keri Hilson; Marcella Araica	Blackout	2007	
"Breathe on Me"	Stephen Lee; Steve Anderson; Lisa Greene	In the Zone	2003	
"Brightest Morning Star"	Britney Spears; Lukasz Gottwald; Sia Furler; Henry Walter	Britney Jean ‡	2013	
"Can't Make You Love Me"	Kristian Lundin; Andreas Carlsson; Max Martin	Oops!... I Did It Again	2000	
"Change Your Mind (No Seas Cortes)"	Julia Michaels; Justin Tranter; Mattias Larsson; Robin Fredriksson	Glory ‡	2016	
"Chaotic"	Christian Karlsson; Pontus Winnberg; Henrik Jonback; Michelle Bell	Britney & Kevin: Chaotic	2005	
"Chillin' with You" featuring Jamie Lynn Spears	Britney Spears; William Adams; Anthony Preston; Joshua Lopez	Britney Jean	2013	
"Cinderella"	Max Martin; Rami Yacoub; Britney Spears	Britney	2001	
"Circus"	Lukasz Gottwald; Claude Kelly; Benjamin Levin	Circus	2008	
"Clumsy"	Talay Riley; Warren Felder; Alex Niceforo	Glory	2016	
"Coupure Électrique"	Britney Spears; Lance Eric Shipp; Nathalia Marshall; Rachael Kennedy	Glory ‡	2016	
"Crazy" Kevin Federline featuring Britney Spears	Bosko Kante; Kevin Federline; G Louriano; DJ Emz	Playing with Fire	2006	
"Criminal"	Karl Schuster; Max Martin; Tiffany Amber	Femme Fatale	2011	
"Dear Diary"	Britney Spears; Jason Blume; Eugene Wilde	Oops!... I Did It Again	2000	
"Deep in My Heart"	Per Magnusson; David Kreuger; Andreas Carlsson	...Baby One More Time ‡	1999	
"Do Somethin'"	Christian Karlsson; Pontus Winnberg; Henrik Jonback; Angela Hunte	Greatest Hits: My Prerogative	2004	
"Do You Wanna Come Over?"	Sandy Chila; Julia Michaels; Justin Tranter; Mattias Larsson; Robin Fredriksson	Glory	2016	
"Don't Cry"	Britney Spears; William Adams; Richard Gonzalez; Joshua Lopez	Britney Jean	2013	
"Don't Go Knockin' on My Door"	Max Martin; Rami Yacoub; Jake Schulze; Alexander Kronlund	Oops!... I Did It Again	2000	
"Don't Hang Up"	Britney Spears; Brian Kierulf; Josh Schwartz	In the Zone ‡	2003	
"Don't Keep Me Waiting"	Rodney Jerkins; Michaela Shiloh; Thomas Lumpkins	Femme Fatale ‡	2011	
"Don't Let Me Be the Last to Know"	Robert Lange; Shania Twain; Keith Scott	Oops!... I Did It Again	2000	
"(Drop Dead) Beautiful" featuring Sabi	Jeremy Coleman; Joshua Coleman; Ester Dean; Mathieu Jomphe; Benjamin Levin	Femme Fatale	2011	
"E-Mail My Heart"	Eric Foster White	...Baby One More Time	1999	
"Early Mornin'"	Britney Spears; Richard Hall; Christopher Stewart; Penelope Magnet	In the Zone	2003	
"Everybody"	J.R. Rotem; Evan "Kidd" Bogart; Annie Lennox; Dave Stewart	Blackout ‡	2007	
"Everytime"	Britney Spears; Annet Artani	In the Zone	2003	
"Freakshow"	Britney Spears; Christian Karlsson; Pontus Winnberg; Henrik Jonback; Ezekiel Lewis; Patrick Smith	Blackout	2007	
"From the Bottom of My Broken Heart"	Eric Foster White	...Baby One More Time	1999	
"Gasoline"	Lukasz Gottwald; Claude Kelly; Benjamin Levin; Bonnie McKee; Emily Wright	Femme Fatale	2011	
"Get Back"	Corte Ellis; Nathaniel Hills; Marcella Araica	Blackout ‡	2007	
"Get Naked (I Got a Plan)"	Corte Ellis; Nathaniel Hills; Marcella Araica	Blackout	2007	
"Gimme More"	Nathaniel Hills; James Washington; Keri Hilson; Marcella Araica	Blackout	2007	
"Girl in the Mirror"	Jörgen Elofsson	Oops!... I Did It Again ‡	2000	
"Girls and Boys"	Linda Perry	Britney Spears: In the Zone ‡	2004	
"Hands" among various artists	Justin Tranter; Julia Michaels; BloodPop	Non-album single	2016	
"Hard to Forget Ya"	Oscar Görres; Ian Kirkpatrick; Brittany Coney; Denisia Andrews; Edward Drewett	Glory	2016	
"He About to Lose Me"	Rodney Jerkins; Ina Wroldsen	Femme Fatale ‡	2011	
"Heart"	George Teren; Eugene Wilde	Oops!... I Did It Again ‡	2000	
"Heaven on Earth"	Michael McGroarty; Nick Huntingto; Nicole Morier	Blackout	2007	
"Hold It Against Me"	Max Martin; Lukasz Gottwald; Mathieu Jomphe; Bonnie McKee	Femme Fatale	2011	
"Hold Me Closer" with Elton John	Elton John; Bernie Taupin; Andrew Wotman; Henry Walter	The Lockdown Sessions ‡	2022	
"Hold on Tight"	Britney Spears; Allan P. Grigg	Britney Jean ‡	2013	
"The Hook Up"	Britney Spears; Christopher Stewart; Thabiso Nkhereanye; Penelope Magnet	In the Zone	2003	
"Hot as Ice"	Faheem Najm; Nathaniel Hills; Marcella Araica	Blackout	2007	
"How I Roll"	Christian Karlsson; Henrik Jonback; Magnus Lidehäll; Pontus Winnberg; Bonnie McKee; Nicole Morier	Femme Fatale	2011	
"(I Can't Get No) Satisfaction" ≠	Mick Jagger; Keith Richards	Oops!... I Did It Again	2000	
"(I Got That) Boom Boom"	Roy Hamilton; Chyna Royal; Deongelo Holmes; Eric Jackson	In the Zone	2003	
"I Love Rock 'n' Roll" ≠	Jake Hooker; Alan Merrill	Britney	2001	
"I Run Away"	Josh Schwartz; Brian Kierulf	Britney ‡	2001	
"I Wanna Go"	Max Martin; Karl Schuster; Savan Kotecha	Femme Fatale	2011	
"I Will Be There"	Max Martin; Andreas Carlsson	...Baby One More Time	1999	
"I Will Still Love You" featuring Don Philip	Eric Foster White	...Baby One More Time	1999	
"I'll Never Stop Loving You" ≠	Jason Blume; Steve Diamond	...Baby One More Time ‡	1999	
"I'm a Slave 4 U"	Chad Hugo; Pharrell Williams	Britney	2001	
"I'm Not a Girl, Not Yet a Woman"	Max Martin; Rami Yacoub; Dido Armstrong	Britney	2001	
"I'm So Curious"	Britney Spears; Eric Foster White	...Baby One More Time ‡	1999	
"I've Just Begun (Having My Fun)"	Britney Spears; Michelle Bell; Christian Karlsson; Pontus Winnberg; Henrik Jonback	Britney Spears: In the Zone ‡	2004	
"If I'm Dancing"	Brandon Lowry; Chantal Kreviazuk; Simon Wilcox; Ian Kirkpatrick	Glory ‡	2016	
"If U Seek Amy"	Max Martin; Karl Schuster; Savan Kotecha; Alexander Kronlund	Circus	2008	
"Inside Out"	Lukasz Gottwald; Jacob Kasher Hindlin; Mathieu Jomphe; Max Martin; Bonnie McKee	Femme Fatale	2011	
"Intimidated"	Britney Spears; Rodney Jerkins; Josh Schwartz; Brian Kierulf	"I'm a Slave 4 U"	2001	
"Invitation"	Britney Spears; Julia Michaels; Justin Tranter; Nick Monson	Glory	2016	
"It Should Be Easy" featuring will.i.am	Britney Spears; William Adams; David Guetta; Giorgio Tuinfort; Nick Rotteveel; Marcus van Wattum	Britney Jean	2013	
"Just Like Me"	Britney Spears; Julia Michaels; Justin Tranter; Nick Monson	Glory	2016	
"Just Luv Me"	Magnus Hoiberg; Julia Michaels; Daniel Omelio	Glory	2016	
"Kill the Lights"	Nathaniel Hills; James Washington; Luke Boyd; Marcella Araica	Circus	2008	
"Like a Virgin / Hollywood" (live from 2003 MTV Video Music Awards) Madonna featuring Britney Spears, Christina Aguilera, Missy Elliott	Billy Steinberg; Tom Kelly; Madonna; Mirwais Ahmadzaï	Remixed & Revisited	2003	
"Lace and Leather"	Lukasz Gottwald; Benjamin Levin; Frankie Storm; Ronnie Jackson	Circus	2008	
"Let Me Be"	Britney Spears; Josh Schwartz; Brian Kierulf	Britney	2001	
"Liar"	Jason Evigan; Breyan Isaac; Nash Overstreet; Danny Parker	Glory ‡	2016	
"Lonely"	Britney Spears; Josh Schwartz; Brian Kierulf; Rodney Jerkins	Britney	2001	
"Love Me Down"	Evan Bogart; Andrew Goldstein; Jesse Saint John; Jessiva Karpov	Glory	2016	
"Lucky"	Max Martin; Rami Yacoub; Alexander Kronlund	Oops!... I Did It Again	2000	
"Make Me" featuring G-Eazy	Britney Spears; Matthew Burns; Joe Janiak; Gerald Gillum	Glory	2016	
"Man on the Moon"	Jason Evigan; Ilsey Juber; Marcus Lomax; Brandon Lowry; Phoebe Ryan	Glory	2016	
"Mannequin"	Britney Spears; Harvey Mason Jr. Rob Knox; James Fauntleroy II	Circus	2008	
"Me Against the Music" featuring Madonna	Britney Spears; Madonna; Christopher Stewart; Thabiso Nkhereanye; Penelope Magnet; Terius Nash; Gary O'Brien	In the Zone	2003	
"Mind Your Business" with will.i.am	Britney Spears; Anthony Preston; Johnny Goldstein; William Adams	Non-album single	2023	
"Mmm Papi"	Britney Spears; Henry Walter; Adrien Gough; Peter-John Kerr; Nicole Morier	Circus	2008	
"Mona Lisa"	Britney Spears; Teddy Campbell; David Kochanski	Britney & Kevin: Chaotic	2005	
"Mood Ring"	Dijon McFarlane; Nicholas Audino; Te Whiti Warbrick; Lewis Hughes; Jon Asher; Melanie Fontana	Glory ‡	2016	
"My Baby"	Britney Spears; Guy Sigsworth	Circus	2008	
"My Only Wish (This Year)"	Brian Kierulf; Josh Schwartz	Platinum Christmas	2000	
"My Prerogative" ≠	Bobby Brown; Gene Griffin; Edward Teddy Riley	Greatest Hits: My Prerogative	2004	
"Matches" with Backstreet Boys	Michael Wise; Asia Whiteacre; Justin Tranter; Ian Kirkpatrick	Glory ‡	2020	
"Now That I Found You"	Britney Spears; Danny O'Donoghue; Giorgio Tuinfort; David Guetta; Frédéric Riesterer	Britney Jean ‡	2013	
"One Kiss from You"	Steve Lunt	Oops!... I Did It Again	2000	
"Ooh La La"	Lukasz Gottwald; Joshua Coleman; Henry Walter; Bonnie McKee; Jacob Kasher Hindlin; Lola Blanc; Fransisca Hall	The Smurfs 2: Music from and Inspired By	2013	
"Ooh Ooh Baby"	Britney Spears; Kara DioGuardi; Farid Nassar; Eric Coomes	Blackout	2007	
"Oops!... I Did It Again"	Max Martin; Rami Yacoub	Oops!... I Did It Again	2000	
"Out from Under" ≠	Shelly Peiken; Arnthor Birgisson; Wayne Hector	Circus	2008	
"Outrageous"	Robert Kelly	In the Zone	2003	
"Outta This World"	Nathaniel Hills; James Washington; Keri Hilson; Marcella Araica	Blackout ‡	2007	
"Over to You Now"	Guy Sigsworth; Imogen Heap; Robin Carlsson; Alexander Kronlund	Britney & Kevin: Chaotic ‡	2005	
"Overprotected"	Max Martin; Rami Yacoub	Britney	2001	
"Passenger"	Britney Spears; Thomas Pentz; Sia Furler; Andrew Swanson; Katy Perry	Britney Jean	2013	
"Perfect Lover"	Nathaniel Hills; James Washington; Keri Hilson; Marcella Araica	Blackout	2007	
"Perfume"	Britney Spears; Sia Furler; Christopher Braide	Britney Jean	2013	
"Phonography"	Christian Karlsson; Pontus Winnberg; Henrik Jonback; Balewa Muhammad; Candice Nelson; Ezekiel "Zeke" Lewis; Patrick Smith	Circus ‡	2008	
"Piece of Me"	Christian Karlsson; Pontus Winnberg; Klas Åhlund	Blackout	2007	
"Pretty Girls" with Iggy Azalea	George Astasio; Jason Pebworth; Jon Shave; Maegan Cottone; Amethyst Amelia Kelly; Perri Edwards; Jesy Nelson; Leigh-Anne Pinnock; Jade Thirlwall	Non-album single	2015	
"Private Show"	Britney Spears; Carla Williams; Tramaine Winfrey; Simon Smith	Glory	2016	
"Quicksand"	Stefani Germanotta; Fernando Garibay	Circus ‡	2008	
"Radar"	Christian Karlsson; Pontus Winnberg; Henrik Jonback; Balewa Muhammad; Candice Nelson; Ezekiel Lewis; Patrick Smith	Blackout	2007	
"Radar"	Christian Karlsson; Pontus Winnberg; Henrik Jonback; Balewa Muhammad; Candice Nelson; Ezekiel Lewis; Patrick Smith	Circus ‡	2008	
"Rock Boy"	Nathaniel Hills; Marcella Araica; Michael Shimshack	Circus ‡	2008	
"Rock Me In"	Britney Spears; Greg Kurstin; Nicole Morier	Circus ‡	2008	
"S&M" (remix) Rihanna featuring Britney Spears	Mikkel S. Eriksen; Tor Erik Hermansen; Sandy Wilhelm; Ester Dean; Britney Spears	Non-album single	2011	
"Scary"	Britney Spears; Fraser T. Smith; Kasia Livingston	Femme Fatale ‡	2011	
"Scream & Shout" with will.i.am	Jean Baptiste; Tulisa; William Adams	#willpower	2012	
"Seal It with a Kiss"	Lukasz Gottwald; Max Martin; Bonnie McKee; Henry Walter	Femme Fatale	2011	
"Selfish"	Ester Dean; Mikkel S. Eriksen; Tor Erik Hermansen; Sandy Wilhelm; Traci Hale	Femme Fatale ‡	2011	
"Shadow"	Britney Spears; Lauren Christy; Scott Spock; Graham Edwards; Charlie Midnight	In the Zone	2003	
"Shattered Glass"	Lukasz Gottwald; Claude Kelly; Benjamin Levin	Circus	2008	
"Showdown"	Britney Spears; Cathy Dennis; Christian Karlsson; Pontus Winnberg; Henrik Jonback	In the Zone	2003	
"Slumber Party" featuring Tinashe	Mattias Larsson; Robin Frediksson; Julia Michaels; Justin Tranter	Glory	2016	
"SMS (Bangerz)" Miley Cyrus featuring Britney Spears	Michael L. Williams II; Marquel Middlebrooks; Sean Garrett; Miley Cyrus	Bangerz	2013	
"Soda Pop" featuring Mikey Bassie	Mikey Bassie; Eric Foster White	...Baby One More Time	1999	
"Someday (I Will Understand)"	Britney Spears	Britney & Kevin: Chaotic	2005	
"Sometimes"	Jörgen Elofsson	...Baby One More Time	1999	
"Stronger"	Max Martin; Rami Yacoub	Oops!... I Did It Again	2000	
"Swimming in the Stars"	Matthew Koma; Dan Book; Alexei Misoul	Glory ‡	2020	
"That's Where You Take Me"	Britney Spears; Josh Schwartz; Brian Kierulf	Britney	2001	
"Thinkin' About You"	Mikey Bassie; Eric Foster White	...Baby One More Time	1999	
"Tik Tik Boom" featuring T.I.	Britney Spears; Anthony Preston; Onique Williams; Clifford Joseph Harris; Andre Lindal; Damien LeRoy; Joakim Haukaas	Britney Jean	2013	
"Til It's Gone"	Britney Spears; Jenson Vaughan; Rosette Sharma; Anthony Preston; David Guetta; Giorgio Tuinfort; William Adams	Britney Jean	2013	
"Till the World Ends"	Lukasz Gottwald; Alexander Kronlund; Max Martin; Kesha Sebert	Femme Fatale	2011	
"Tom's Diner" ≠ Giorgio Moroder featuring Britney Spears	Suzanne Vega	Déja Vú	2015	
"Touch of My Hand"	Britney Spears; Jimmy Harry; Balewa Muhammad; Sheppard Solomon	In the Zone	2003	
"Toxic"	Cathy Dennis; Christian Karlsson; Pontus Winnberg; Henrik Jonback	In the Zone	2003	
"Toy Soldier"	Christian Karlsson; Pontus Winnberg; Magnus Wallbert; Sean Garrett	Blackout	2007	
"Trip to Your Heart"	Christian Karlsson; Pontus Winnberg; Henrik Jonback; Magnus Lidehäll; Nicole Morier; Sophie Stern	Femme Fatale	2011	
"Trouble"	Christian Karlsson; Pontus Winnberg; Henrik Jonback; Balewa Muhammad; Candice Nelson; Ezekiel "Zeke" Lewis; Patrick Smith	Circus ‡	2008	
"Trouble for Me"	Fraser T. Smith; Heather Bright; Livvi Franc	Femme Fatale	2011	
"Unusual You"	Christian Karlsson; Pontus Winnberg; Henrik Jonback; Kasia Livingston	Circus	2008	
"Up n' Down"	Karl Schuster; Max Martin; Savan Kotecha	Femme Fatale ‡	2011	
"Walk on By"	Jörgen Elofsson; David Kreuger	"Stronger"	2000	
"What It's Like to Be Me"	Justin Timberlake; Wade J. Robson	Britney	2001	
"What You Need"	Britney Spears; Carla Williams; Tramaine Winfrey; Simon Smith	Glory	2016	
"What U See (Is What U Get)"	Per Magnusson; David Kreuger; Jörgen Elofsson; Rami Yacoub	Oops!... I Did It Again	2000	
"What's Going On" ≠ among Artists Against AIDS Worldwide	Al Cleveland; Renaldo Benson; Marvin Gaye	Non-album single	2001	
"When I Found You"	Jörgen Elofsson; Dan Hill	Britney ‡	2001	
"When Your Eyes Say It"	Diane Warren	Oops!... I Did It Again	2000	
"Where Are You Now"	Max Martin; Andreas Carlsson	Oops!... I Did It Again	2000	
"Why Should I Be Sad"	Pharrell Williams	Blackout	2007	
"Womanizer"	Nikesha Briscoe; Rafael Akinyemi	Circus	2008	
"Work Bitch"	Britney Spears; William Adams; Otto Jettman; Sebastian Ingrosso; Derek Weintraub; Anthony Preston; Ruth-Anne Cunningham	Britney Jean	2013	
"(You Drive Me) Crazy"	Jörgen Elofsson; Per Magnusson; David Kreuger; Max Martin	...Baby One More Time	1999	
"You Got It All" ≠	Rupert Holmes	Oops!... I Did It Again ‡	2000	
