= Matches (Britney Spears and Backstreet Boys song) =

2020 single by Britney Spears and Backstreet Boys

Single by Britney Spears and Backstreet Boys

from the album Glory
- Released: December 18, 2020
- Recorded: 2017
- Studio: Encore Studios (Burbank, CA)
- Genre: Dance; electropop; glitch pop
- Length: 2:52
- Label: RCA
- Songwriters: Michael Wise; Asia Whiteacre; Justin Tranter; Ian Kirkpatrick
- Producers: Wise; Kirkpatrick

Britney Spears singles chronology
| "Swimming in the Stars" (2020) | "Matches" (2020) | "Hold Me Closer" (2022) |

Backstreet Boys singles chronology
| "No Place" (2019) | "Matches" (2020) | "Last Christmas" (2022) |

Audio video
- "Matches" on YouTube

"Matches" is a song recorded by American singer Britney Spears and American boy band Backstreet Boys from the 2020 deluxe edition of Spears' ninth studio album, Glory (2016). It was written by Asia Whiteacre, Justin Tranter, and the song's producers Michael Wise and Ian Kirkpatrick. It is a dance, electropop, and glitch pop song consisting of the lyrics describing a dangerous relationship. The single met with positive reception, with critics pointing out the "90's vibe" that the song gives off.

"Matches" was initially intended for the Backstreet Boys' ninth studio album DNA (2019); however, it did not appear on the album. It was later repurposed to be a collaboration between Spears and the boy band, appearing on the 2020 deluxe edition of Glory. Sony Music sent the song to radio airplay in Italy on December 18, 2020, as the third single from the 2020 reissues, and overall fifth and final single for the album. Commercially, it appeared in digital charts in Canada, Germany, the United Kingdom, and the United States, peaking within the top five on the Malaysian Recording Industry Association of Malaysia (RIM) singles chart.

== Background and composition ==
"Matches" was produced by Michael Wise and Ian Kirkpatrick and co-written by Asia Whiteacre and Justin Tranter. "Matches" marks the very first collaboration between Spears and the Backstreet Boys, even though both were at their prime in the late 1990s and early 2000s. However, both artists previously contributed their vocals to the cover of "What's Going On" in 2001 as a part of the Artists Against AIDS Worldwide campaign. The song was recorded early in 2017 solely by Backstreet Boys for their ninth studio album DNA (2019), but did not cut. However, Spears heard the track and loved it and chose to re-record it, but keeping Backstreet Boys vocals in it.

"Matches" is a fast dance, electropop and glitch pop song containing glitchy and electronic sound effects and heavily treated vocals. Its lyrics describe dangerous love and they have been described as "sultry" by USA Today's Sara Moniuszko. It also contains many reversals; in the pre-chorus, the Backstreet Boys are singing "Our fire is killing me / The good kind of killing me", when Spears starts her verse with the line "I like the way you dress", later adding "And the way you undress".

== Release ==
Following the #JusticeForGlory campaign that was launched by Spears's fans on social media during the COVID-19 pandemic, the singer unveiled a new cover art for Glory on May 8, 2020, nearly four years after its release. Three weeks later, Spears announced that "Mood Ring" would be released worldwide on all streaming and download platforms. The deluxe reissue of Glory was released on December 4, 2020, featuring previously released "Mood Ring", its remixes, and two new songs: "Swimming in the Stars" and "Matches". On December 11, the reissue was released to digital download and streaming media. "Matches" impacted Italian radio airplay on December 18, 2020, making it Glory's fifth single. One of the boy band members, AJ McLean, was positive about the song's release and feeling it gives off, and he said he would like to record a music video in "quarantine style."

== Critical reception ==
The song received generally favorable reviews. Writing for Rolling Stone, Jon Blisten called "Matches" a "delightful hit of contemporary club pop" with strings that are "reminiscent of the Max Martin-style songs that made Spears and BSB superstars". Tom Breihan from Stereogum called the track "catchy" and "fast, glitchy pop". He also added that "'It's Backstreet back, bitch' on the intro feels like a missed opportunity". In opposite to Rolling Stone's Blisten, Wren Graves of Consequence of Sound stated that "Matches" "isn't a callback to the glory days of denim dresses and Max Martin productions; instead, it's a trip through the last decade of horny EDM". Writing for ABC News Radio, Andrea Dresdale called the song a "hot banger".

== Commercial performance ==
"Matches" are charted on the US and Canada Digital Song Sales charts, placing numbers 11 and 7, respectively. In Europe, the song peaked at number 22 on the Germany Digital Song Sales chart and Hungary Singles chart and 48 on UK Download Chart. The song also reached number 40 on New Zealand Hot Single Sales chart and managed to peak at number five on Malaysia's RIM chart in its eleventh week of charting.

== Credits and personnel ==
Credits adapted from Tidal.

- Britney Spears – lead vocals
- Backstreet Boys – lead vocals
- Ian Kirkpatrick – songwriting, production
- Michael Wise – songwriting, production
- Justin Tranter – songwriting
- Asia Whiteacre – songwriting
- Josh Gudwin – mixing
- Dave Kutch – mastering

== Charts ==
Chart performance for "Matches"
| Chart (2020–2021) | Peak position |
|---|---|
| Canada Digital Song Sales (Billboard) | 7 |
| Euro Digital Song Sales (Billboard) | 17 |
| France Singles Sales (SNEP) | 40 |
| Germany Digital Song Sales (Official German Charts) | 22 |
| Hungary (Single Top 40) | 22 |
| Malaysia (RIM) | 5 |
| New Zealand Hot Singles (RMNZ) | 40 |
| Russia Airplay (TopHit) | 170 |
| UK Singles Downloads (Official Charts) | 48 |
| UK Singles Sales (Official Charts) | 53 |
| US Digital Song Sales (Billboard) | 11 |
