= Swimming in the Stars =

2020 single by Britney Spears

Single by Britney Spears

from the album Glory
- Written: 2015
- Released: December 2, 2020
- Recorded: 2016
- Studio: Studio at the Palms (Las Vegas, NV); Dry Snack Sound (Los Angeles, CA)
- Genre: Electropop
- Length: 3:21
- Label: RCA
- Songwriters: Matthew Koma; Dan Book; Alexei Misoul
- Producers: Koma; Book

Britney Spears singles chronology
"Mood Ring" (2020)	"Swimming in the Stars" (2020)	"Matches" (2020)

Visualizer video
- "Swimming in the Stars" on YouTube

"Swimming in the Stars" is a song by American singer Britney Spears from the 2020 deluxe edition of her ninth studio album, Glory (2016). It was released as the second single from the album's 2020 reissues, and overall fourth single from the album, on December 2, 2020, coinciding with the singer's 39th birthday. The song was conceived during the initial recording of Glory, with the track being written in 2015 by the producers Matthew Koma and Dan Book, with an additional writing provided by Alexei Misoul. It is an electropop ballad that focuses on optimism and escapism over a synth groove.

"Swimming in the Stars" was announced through becoming available for pre-order as a part of the Urban Outfitters's "11/11 Singles Day" promotion as an exclusive 12-inch vinyl single on November 11, 2020. The song received positive reviews from music critics, whom praised its production and positive message. The single was successful in Malaysia and Hungary, respectively charting at numbers three and thirteen.

== Background and composition ==
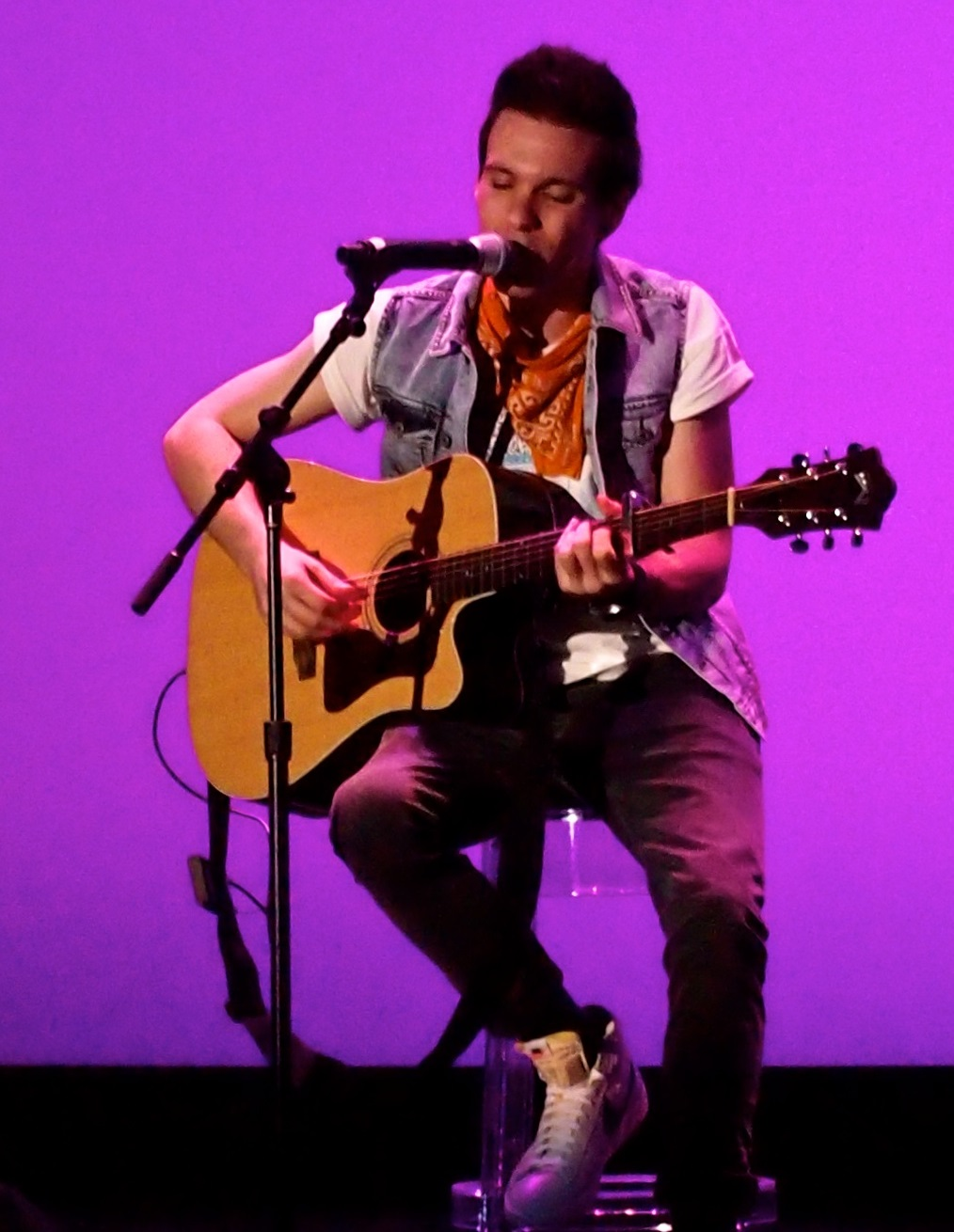
Matthew Koma who co-wrote and co-produced "Swimming in the Stars" said that working with Spears was a "surreal" experience for him.

"Swimming in the Stars" was written by Matthew Koma, Dan Book, and Alexei Misoul in 2015 when Koma revealed he had been working with Spears though his tracks never made it on to the initial release of the album. During an interview with PopCrush, Koma said that Spears is "extremely talented" and is "super surreal to sit there and hear [her] sing one of your songs". The song was recorded in 2016.

"Swimming in the Stars" is an electropop ballad containing a synth-laden groove. The song contains optimistic and catchy lyrics with dreamy escapism spread throughout its chorus. According to Jenzia Burgos of StyleCaster, the song is reminiscent of Spears's interest in astrology, with giving an example of the song's bridge, where she is singing about her sister zodiac sign: "What if we could float here forever? / In these Gemini dreams together".

== Release ==
Following the #JusticeForGlory campaign that was launched by Spears's fans on social media during the COVID-19 pandemic, the singer unveiled a new cover art for Glory on May 8, 2020, nearly four years after its release. Three weeks later, Spears announced that "Mood Ring" would be released worldwide on all streaming and download platforms the next day, on May 29, 2020. Later that year, "Swimming in the Stars" was unveiled since it became available for pre-order as part of the Urban Outfitters's "11/11 Singles Day" promotion as an exclusive 12-inch vinyl single on November 11, 2020; however, orders would not ship until January 15, 2021. The release took critics by surprise, having been released amidst the #FreeBritney movement and Spears's work hiatus. After the announcement of the song's vinyl release, a 12-seconds long snippet was released by Urban Outfitters via Instagram.

"Swimming in the Stars" was released to digital download and streaming media on December 2, 2020 as the fourth single from Glory, coinciding with Spears's 39th birthday. Two days later, the track was included on the 2020 deluxe physical reissue of Glory with "Mood Ring" and "Matches". On the single cover, Spears crouches on one knee in the sand next to broken chains, wearing gold crop top and high-low sarong skirt, which were made of the same material as her bracelets and shoes. She is set to be on desert oasis. On the day of release, a visualiser to the song was published on Spears's YouTube channel, featuring the single cover with animated soft waves and glistering stars behind the singer. Brea Cubit from PopSugar called the visualizer "mesmorizing".

== Critical reception ==
Lake Schatz of Consequence of Sound described the lyrics of "Swimming in the Stars" as "positive", since they are talking about "briefly forgetting our worries and holding onto joy". Jon Blistein of Rolling Stone wrote that the song "boasts a big drum pop groove, which anchors a wash of atmospheric synths and Spears' unmistakable vocals as she croons". Writing for Vulture, Rebecca Alter said that "Swimming in the Stars" has "big liquid-stardust, shimmery, synth-y sound perfect for stargazing when it gets dark at like 2PM". Gary Dinges from USA Today stated that the song is "classic Britney" and contains "catchy lyrics". Mike Wass from Idolator called the song an "absolute gem" and described its chorus as "sweeping". In The Musical Hype, "Swimming in the Stars" was named a "well-produced record with a relatable theme", where Matthew Koma's production was described as "lush, sleek, and smooth".

== Commercial performance ==
"Swimming in the Stars" mostly entered component charts. It peaked at number 25 on the Canadian Digital Song Sales, 28 on Germany Digital Song Sales, 36 on UK Download Chart and 18 on the US Digital Song Sales chart. However, the song managed to peak at number three on Malaysia's RIM chart and number 13 on the Hungary Singles Sales chart. Additionally, the song also charted at number 96 on the Croatian Airplay chart.

== Credits and personnel ==
Personnel

- Britney Spears – lead vocals
- Klara Elias – background vocals
- Matthew Koma – songwriting, production, record engineering
- Dan Book – songwriting
- Alexei Misoul – songwriting
- Emily Wright – vocal production
- Rachael Findlen – assistant engineer
- Adam Hawkins – mixing
- Dave Kutch – mastering

Design

- Gavin Taylor – art direction, design
- David LaChapelle – photography

== Charts ==
Chart performance for "Swimming in the Stars"
Chart (2020–2021)	Peak position
Canada Digital Song Sales (Billboard)	25
Croatia (HRT)	95
France Singles Sales (SNEP)	20
Germany Digital Song Sales (Official German Charts)	28
Hungary (Single Top 40)	13
Malaysia (RIM)	3
New Zealand Hot Singles (RMNZ)	37
UK Singles Downloads (Official Charts)	36
UK Singles Sales (Official Charts)	39
US Digital Song Sales (Billboard)	18

== Release history ==
Release formats and dates for "Swimming in the Stars"
Region	Date	Format(s)	Label	Ref.
Various	December 2, 2020	Digital download; streaming	RCA	
United States	January 15, 2021	12-inch	RCA	
