= Mood Ring (Britney Spears song) =

- Official cover for the digital single

Single by Britney Spears

from the album Glory
- Written: February 2015
- Released: July 10, 2020
- Recorded: June 2015
- Studio: Encore Studios (Burbank, CA)
- Genre: Electro-R&B
- Length: 3:48
- Label: RCA
- Composers: Dijon McFarlane; Nicholas Audino; Te Whiti Warbrick; Lewis Hughes
- Lyricists: Jon Asher; Melanie Fontana
- Producer: DJ Mustard

Britney Spears singles chronology
"Slumber Party" (2016)	"Mood Ring" (2020)	"Swimming in the Stars" (2020)

"Mood Ring" (also known as "Mood Ring (By Demand)" upon its 2020 international release) is a song recorded by American singer Britney Spears for her ninth studio album, Glory (2016). It was written by Dijon McFarlane, Nicholas Audino, Te Whiti Warbrick, Lewis Hughes, Jon Asher, and Melanie Fontana. The "electro-tinged" R&B song was produced by DJ Mustard and co-produced by Twice as Nice, with vocal production provided by Asher.

Originally appearing as a bonus track for the Japanese edition upon its parental album release on September 14, 2016, "Mood Ring" was later included on the 2020 standard edition of Glory as the thirteenth track, which released on May 29, 2020 following a sudden resurgence in popularity of the album earlier that month. The track sold 13,300 copies during its first week of availability in the United States. It received a remix extended play treatment on June 26, 2020. Later, Sony Music issued the song to radio airplay in Italy as the lead single from the 2020 reissues and overall third single from Glory on July 10, 2020, almost four years after the album's release.

== Background and development ==
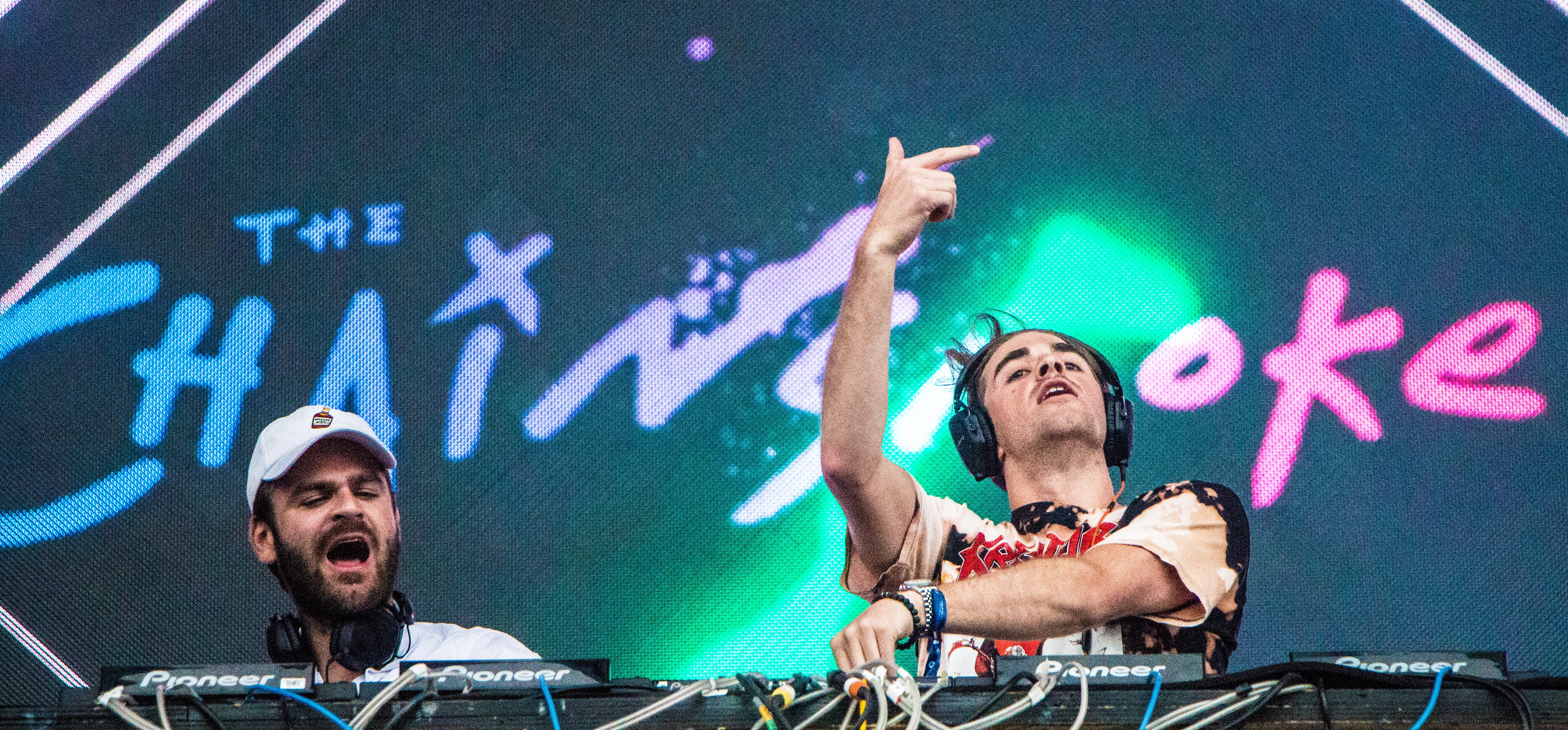
"Mood Ring" was originally written as a collaboration between Spears and the Chainsmokers.

"Mood Ring" was written in February 2015 by American songwriters Jon Asher and Melanie Fontana, two self-proclaimed fans of Spears. After composing the song on a piano under the name "Mood Swings", the duo rewrote it to an instrumental track that was later used for "Waterbed", a song featured on the Chainsmokers' first EP, Bouquet (2015). While it was originally intended to be a potential collaboration between the singer and the Chainsmokers, the group turned it down, calling it "too girly". They, however, asked both Asher and Fontana to write them a "more masculine" version of the song, which eventually led to them writing "Setting Fires", a song that was featured on the group's second EP, Collage (2016). Over the course of the next three months, the two songwriters sent an a cappella version of the song to several different record producers. It eventually got to DJ Mustard via one of Asher's mutual friends, who created a scratch demo in two days.

Following the rework of the song by DJ Mustard, Asher and Fontana were informed in early April 2015 that Spears "has put [their] demo on a hold" with Omar Grant and the Roc Nation team. Spears eventually recorded "Mood Ring" in June 2015; it was also one of the first songs that was recorded for the singer's then-upcoming ninth studio album. Fontana, who was in Finland when she found out that the singer would be recording the song, wanted to fly to Los Angeles to be in the studio with her, but was unable to due to the fact she had already finished recording the song. According to Fontana, it only took Spears an hour to record her vocals, which to her meant that she "knew the song inside and out and really vibed with it". She later revealed that both she and Asher have composed at least ten other tracks for the album, of which "Mood Ring" was the only one to get cut. DJ Mustard later confirmed in July 2015 during the Wireless Festival that he was working with Spears, citing the work to be "harder than hard."

== Composition ==
According to Asher, both him and Fontana wanted to write a song for Spears that "encapsulated [her] entire essence". During the writing process, the duo had "full-on Britney brain" and imagined the singer performing the song on stage and in a music video. In addition, they frequently asked themselves: "What would 'I'm a Slave 4 U' Britney do in 2016?". Fontana, who provided the vocals on the demo version of "Mood Ring", also sang the song in a way that she envisioned Spears would. Musically, the song has been described as an "electro-tinged" and "slinky" R&B song, being one of Spears' "sultry slow jam(s)" and "most R&B-heavy tunes of [her] latest era." It runs for a duration of three minutes and forty-eight seconds. The song follows the traditional verse–chorus song structure over a "slow-burning" production by DJ Mustard, who had worked on several projects such as Anti by Rihanna and Late Nights by Jeremih. Its lyrics focuses on Spears "deciding between two versions of herself" to present to a possible suitor, demonstrating through the first lines "Look in the mirror, who do I see?/Who do I wanna be today?" The singer sings most of the song in her lower register, mostly presented through the chorus "My love is a mood ring, up and down emotions, all these mood swings," as she sings. According to both A&R executive Karen Kwak and Spears herself, "Mood Ring" is one of her favorite songs on Glory. The singer further described the song as being "so vibey and sexy".

== Release ==
“You folks wanted a new album cover ….. ta da there you go [emojis]!!! What was requested next is out now….. I hope you turn #MoodRing up sooooooo loud!!!!”

— Spears announcing the re-issue release of Glory on her Instagram, introducing a new album artwork for the standard edition and the addition of "Mood Ring."

"Mood Ring" was originally teased via DJ Mustard's Twitter account on August 10, 2016. While the song was not featured on the standard nor the deluxe edition of Glory, it was released as a bonus track for the Japanese edition on September 14, 2016. Following the #JusticeForGlory campaign that was launched by Spears' fans on social media during the COVID-19 pandemic, the singer unveiled a new cover art for Glory on May 8, 2020, nearly four years after its release. Three weeks later, Spears announced that "Mood Ring" would be released worldwide on all streaming and download platforms the next day, subtitled "By Demand" to credit her fans for their support of the album. The song was then released along with its parental album reissue on May 29, 2020, listed as the thirteenth track on the standard edition. On June 26, 2020, two remixes of "Mood Ring" were released to streaming services, making it the fourth promotional single from the album. In the following month, the original version of the song was released to Italian radio airplay on July 10, becoming Glory's third single almost four years after the album's release.

== Critical reception ==
Critical reception of the song was positive. Lewis Corner from Digital Spy welcomed it as "a very nice addition indeed", calling it "a sultry slow jam that hears Britney at her most seductive." Tim Chan of Rolling Stone agreed, labelling it as "slinky, slow-burning track", while also noting that "the song is a hazy, alluring slow jam more in line with "Make Me..." the first single from Glory, than the dance-pop tracks Spears is otherwise known for." Writing for Soundazed, Matt Torres called it a "bop" noting "the hypnotic melody and trap-inspired electropop create a lush soundscape for Spears as she sings about her chameleonic love. We know she’s faced relationship woes in the past, but she’s focused on the intoxicating feeling of new love; and the feeling of being with someone that accepts her various sides while still igniting a tantalizing and passionate flame."

== Commercial performance ==
"Mood Ring" mostly charted on component charts; however, it debuted within the top-ten in two countries. In the United States, "Mood Ring" debuted at number 23 on the Billboard Bubbling Under Hot 100 chart with first week sales of 13,300 digital copies sold. In the United Kingdom, the song entered the OCC's UK Download component chart at number 18, In Canada, the song entered the Billboard Digital Song Sales chart at number 32.

In Hungary, "Mood Ring" debuted and peaked at number three on the Single Top 40 chart, making it her highest performance on the chart since her 2016 single "Make Me", which peaked at number six. In Scotland, the song debuted at number ten, making it her first top-ten on the chart since "Work Bitch" (2013), which peaked at number seven. In Germany, the song debuted at number 60 on the Digital Songs Sales chart.

== Track listing ==
- Digital download and streaming (Remixes)
1. "Mood Ring (By Demand)" (Pride Remix) – 3:11
2. "Mood Ring (By Demand)" (Ape Drums Remix) – 3:38

== Credits and personnel ==
- Britney Spears – lead vocals, background vocals
- DJ Mustard – songwriting, composer, producer
- Te Whiti Warbrick – songwriting, composer
- Lewis Hughes – songwriting, composer, co-producer
- Nicholas Audino – songwriting, composer, co-producer
- Melanie Fontana – songwriting, composer, background vocals
- Jon Asher – songwriting, composer, background vocals, vocal production
- DJ Mustard – producer
- Twice as Nice – co-producer
- Julian Brindle – recording engineer
- Jaycen Joshua – mixing
- Maddox Chhim – assistant engineer
- Dave Nakaji – assistant engineer

== Charts ==
Chart performance for "Mood Ring"
Chart (2020)	Peak position
Canada Digital Song Sales (Billboard)	32
Euro Digital Song Sales (Billboard)	15
France Singles Sales (SNEP)	16
Germany Digital Song Sales (Official German Charts)	60
Hungary (Single Top 40)	3
Scottish Singles Sales (Official Charts)	10
UK Singles Downloads (Official Charts)	18
UK Singles Sales (Official Charts)	18
US Bubbling Under Hot 100 (Billboard)	23

== Release history ==
Release formats and dates for "Mood Ring"
Region	Date	Format(s)	Version	Label	Ref.
Various	June 26, 2020 (Note: Release as a promotional single.)	Digital download; streaming	Remixes	RCA	
Italy	July 10, 2020	Radio airplay	Original	Sony	
