= Rocket (En Vogue song) =

Single by En Vogue

from the album Electric Café
- Released: December 1, 2017
- Length: 3:51
- Label: En Vogue; eOne
- Songwriter: Shaffer "Ne-Yo" Smith
- Producer: Curtis Wilson

En Vogue singles chronology
"Have a Seat" (2017)	"Rocket" (2017)	"Reach 4 Me" (2018)

"Rocket" is a song by American recording group En Vogue. It was written by singer-songwriter Ne-Yo and recorded for their seventh studio album Electric Café (2018), while production was handled by Curtis "Sauce" Wilson. The R&B song served as the album's lead single and was released on December 1, 2017 through En Vogue Records and eOne Music. In the United States, the song peaked at number eight on Billboard's Adult R&B Songs chart, becoming En Vogue's first top 10 hit in twenty years.

== Background ==
"Rocket" was written by R&B singer Ne-Yo and produced by his frequent collaborator Curtis "Sauce" Wilson. While En Vogue reteamed with their founders Denzil Foster and Thomas McElroy to work on the majority of their seventh studio album Electric Café (2018), the duo suggested them to record additional tracks. Band member Terry Ellis commented in a 2018 interview: "While sourcing music for our record, they heard that particular track and thought it would be great for us and he called us and said 'Hey, I found this great track for you guys. You’ve got to record it.' And we heard it and we were like 'Oh my gosh! Let’s get in there!" On their decision to release the song as the album's first single, she further elaborated: "It was so different yet it was still giving you those En Vogue signature harmonies. And simply because it was a great song. A really a great song and you know, we've never really released a ballad before as a first single. So, we just thought it would be different."

== Critical reception ==
The song earned generally positive reviews from music critics. Soul Bounce critic Ken Hamm described "Rocket" as "contemporary [...] sexy little number [...] about reaching a mutual climax with your lover using the metaphor of space travel [...] The ladies easily take the listener there with their celestial voices." PennState's CommRadio editor Scott Perdue found that the song "has a more sensual and seductive sound, very much reminiscent of En Vogue’s earlier work" and displayed "a more powerful performance from the trio." Spectrum Culture's Dominic Griffin named "Rocket" an "assured, silky jam [with] some truly stirring vocal harmonies" as well as obe the "album's most exciting songs." Caroline Sullivan from The Guardian considered "Rocket" a "lush, straight-up sex jam," while AllMusic editor Andy Kellman called the song a "coasting bliss-out" and ranked it among his favorite tracks on parent album Electric Café.

== Chart performance ==
"Rocket" debuted at number 28 on the US Billboard Adult R&B Songs in the week ending January 21, 2018, making it the group's first entry on the list since "Ooh Boy" reached number 22 in 2004. For the week ending May 3, 2018, the song reached number 10 on chart, becoming the En Vogue's first top 10 hit on the Adult R&B Songs chart since "Don't Let Go (Love)" spent six weeks in the top 10 in February and March 1997 as well as the band's first top ten on any Billboard airplay chart since June and July 1997, when "Whatever" hit the top 10 on the Rhythmic, R&B/Hip-Hop Airplay and Mainstream R&B/Hip-Hop charts. "Rocket" also reached number 31 on the US R&B/Hip-Hop Airplay chart and was eventually ranked 25th on Billboard's US Adult R&B Songs year-end chart.

== Music video ==
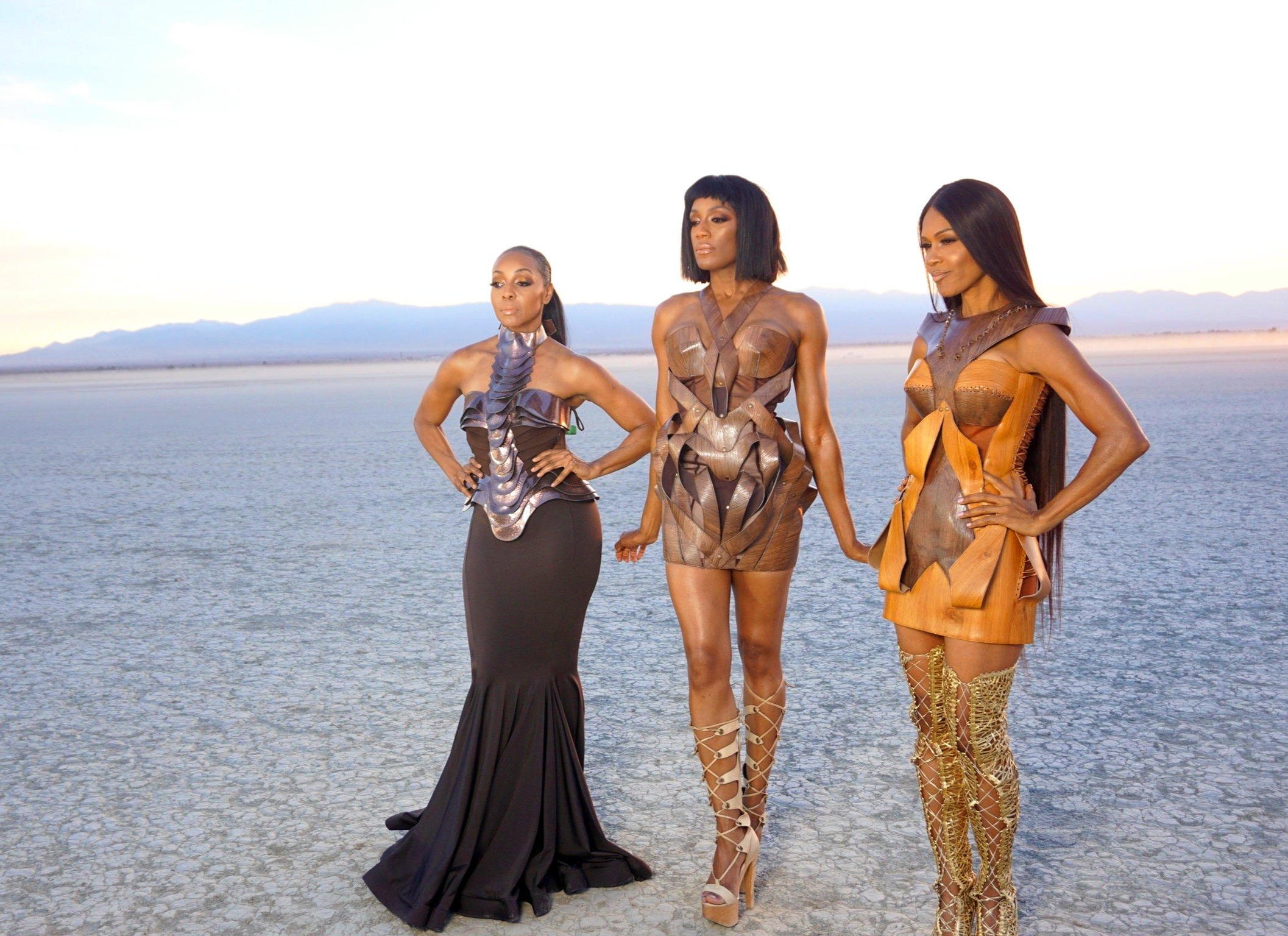
Ellis, Bennett and Herron during the video shoot in the Mojave Desert.

An accompanying music video for "Rocket," directed by Damien Sandoval, was released online on January 22, 2018. Filmed in the El Mirage Lake bed in California, the clip features several shots of Terry Ellis, Rhona Bennett, and Cindy Herron performing in front of a digitally altered Mojave Desert. Ellis called the video "a step into the future", describing its look as "futuristic meets sexy". Herron further commented: "We got there just before sun-up. It was freezing. We got into hair and makeup, and then we got out there, and the sun was hot. It was a really great experience and something new for us. Damien, the director, used a drone. He was just standing there playing with it like a kid, but he was getting these amazing shots. We’re like, ‘Oh my gosh, video-making has changed.’"

== Track listings ==
Digital single

1. "Rocket" – 3:51

== Credits and personnel ==
- Kevin "KD" Davis – mixing engineer
- Rhona Bennett – vocalist
- Terry Ellis – vocalist
- Ne-Yo – writing
- Cindy Herron – vocalist
- Curtis "Sauce" Wilson – producer, writer

== Charts ==
=== Weekly charts ===
Chart (2018)	Peak position
US Adult R&B Songs (Billboard)	8
US R&B/Hip-Hop Airplay (Billboard)	31

=== Year-end charts ===
Chart (2018)	Position
US Adult R&B Songs (Billboard)	25

== Release history ==
Release dates and formats for "Rocket"
Region	Date	Format	Label	Ref
Various	December 1, 2017	Digital download; streaming	En Vogue; eOne	
