= If Ever =

If Ever may refer to:

- "If Ever" (3rd Storee song), 1999
- "If Ever" (Paula Fuga and Jack Johnson song), 2021
