= Toni Estes =

American singer-songwriter

- Born: Tulsa, Oklahoma, U.S.
- Genres: R&B; soul
- Occupations: Singer; songwriter; background vocalist
- Label: Priority

Toni Estes is an American singer, songwriter and background vocalist best known for co-writing Whitney Houston's 1999 hit single "It's Not Right but It's Okay", as well as her other work with producer Rodney "Darkchild" Jerkins. In 2000, Estes released her solo debut album Two Eleven.

== Discography ==
Studio albums

- Two Eleven (2000)

== Songwriting and vocal credits ==
Credits are courtesy of Spotify, Discogs and AllMusic.

Title	Year	Artist	Album
"Can't Let Go"	1997	Laurneá Wilkerson	Betta Listen
"I Do (Whatcha Say Boo)"	1997	Jon B.	Cool Relax
"Ooh Wee Baby" (featuring Daz Dillinger)	1997	Immature	The Journey
"It's Not Right but It's Okay"	1998	Whitney Houston	My Love Is Your Love
"If I Told You That" (solo version)	1998	Whitney Houston	My Love Is Your Love
"Get It Back"	1998	Whitney Houston	My Love Is Your Love
"If I Told You That" (duet with George Michael)	2000	Whitney Houston	Whitney: The Greatest Hits
"Love Hurts"	2000	Gladys Knight	At Last
"Time Will Tell"	2001	Rhona Bennett	Rhona
"Tell Me" (featuring Kojo Funds & Jahlani)	2017	Wretch 32	FR32
"Love Me Like This" (featuring Maia Wright)	2021	Tinie Tempah	Non-album singles
"Rather Be Alone"	2022	Shane Codd	Non-album singles
"Okay (It's Not Right)" (featuring Oxlade & Pheelz)	2022	Whitney Houston	Whitney: New, Classic and Reimagined

== Awards and nominations ==
Year	Ceremony	Award	Result	Ref.
2000	42nd Annual Grammy Awards	Best R&B Song (It's Not Right but It's Okay)	Nominated	
