= Music Mogul =

MusicMogul
- Company type: Corporation
- Website type: Social network service / Online Music World
- Available in: English
- Founded: 2008
- Headquarters: Hollywood, California, {{{location_country}}}
- Owners: Music Mogul, Inc
- Key people: Rodney Jerkins, Chief Creative Officer; Nicholas Longano, CEO
- Employees: 120
- Website: MusicMogul.com
- Advertising: Google, AdSense
- Registration: Recommended
- Launched: February 8, 2009
- Current status: Inactive

MusicMogul.com was an online music world targeting aspiring musicians. They hoped to combine the popularity of social-networking sites, music television shows like "American Idol" and online multiplayer games.

== History ==
Founded in 2008, Music Mogul was the product of a collaboration between professionals from the gaming and music industries: CEO Nicholas Longano, a video game industry veteran; Chief Creative Officer & Music Supervisor Rodney Jerkins, a Grammy – winning music producer; Chief Talent Operations Ray Brown, formerly with Ribeiro & Brown Management, Nu Life Entertainment and Southern Boy Entertainment.

== Music Mogul Features ==
=== Competition ===
Registered users uploaded videos or linked YouTube videos to their profile. These videos were auditions for the Music Mogul Competition. Other users can vote on each video a maximum of one time on a scale of 1 to 10. Musicians are rated both on their points and their average rating.

Performers were to be selected by their online peers and an industry panel of judges to win a three-song demo deal with Rodney Jerkins’ Darkchild Productions.

One live competition was hosted in Los Angeles in August 2009, and was won by Nashville-based singer/songwriter Suzi Oravec.

The site appears to be defunct as of 2010.
