= Ooh Boy (En Vogue song) =

Single by En Vogue

from the album Soul Flower
- Released: February 2004
- Length: 3:33
- Label: 33rd Street; Bayside; Funkigirl
- Songwriter(s): Denzil Foster; Jamie Brewer; Kisha Griffin; Thomas McElroy
- Producer(s): Foster & McElroy

En Vogue singles chronology
"Losin' My Mind" (2004)	"Ooh Boy" (2004)	"Déja Vu" (2014)

"Ooh Boy" is a song recorded by American recording group En Vogue. It was written by Jamie Brewer, Kisha Griffin, Denzil Foster and Thomas McElroy for their sixth studio album Soul Flower (2004), while production was helmed by Foster and McElroy. An uptempo R&B song with a funky disco groove, it features lead vocals from Rhona Bennett and Terry Ellis. "Ooh Boy" was released as the second and final single from the album, serving as its lead single. The song reached the top thirty of the US Billboard Adult R&B Songs chart. In support of the song, En Vogue performed it on several US television shows such as Soul Train and On Air with Ryan Seacrest.

== Background ==
"Ooh Boy" was written by bassist Jamie Brewer, singer Kisha Griffin, and En Vogue mentors Denzil Foster and Thomas McElroy for the band's sixth studio album Soul Flower (2004). Foster and McElroy also served as the song's producer. It was released by 33rd Street Records as the album's second single, while also serving as its leading single, following first single "Losin' My Mind."

== Critical reception ==
"Ooh Boy" received generally positive reviews from music critics. Lynn Norment from Ebony found that the song had "En Vogue's signature catchy, harmonious sound," while People magazine noted that "their voices shine on numbers like the club-ready single." David Jeffries from Allmusic highlighted the song among his three track picks from parent album Soul Flower.

== Chart performance ==
Upon its release, "Ooh Boy" peaked at number 22 on the US Billboard Adult R&B Songs in the week ending October 4, while reaching the top of the Bubbling Under R&B/Hip-Hop Songs chart. It would remain the band's last entry on the former chart until the release of their 2017 single "Rocket" which entered the top ten in February 2018.

== Credits and personnel ==
- Rhona Bennett – vocalist
- Jamie Brewer – writer
- Steve Counter – engineer
- Terry Ellis – vocalist
- Denzil Foster – producer, writer
- Kisha Griffin – writer
- Cindy Herron – vocalist
- Thomas McElroy – producer, writer
- Phillip Scott – engineer

== Charts ==
Chart (2004)	Peak position
US Adult R&B Songs (Billboard)	22
