= Rodney Jerkins =

American record producer (born 1977)

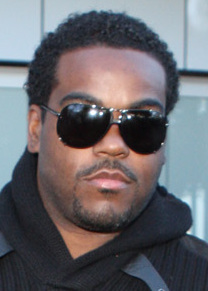
- Jerkins in 2011

Background information
- Also known as: Darkchild
- Born: Rodney Roy Jerkins; July 29, 1977 (age 49); Pleasantville, New Jersey, U.S.
- Origin: Galloway Township, New Jersey, U.S.
- Genres: R&B; hip-hop; gospel; pop
- Occupations: Record producer; rapper; songwriter; music executive
- Years active: 1993–present
- Labels: Capitol; Universal; Epic; BMG; Darkchild; Lifestyle; Alienz Alive
- Spouse: Joy Enriquez (m. 2004)
- Website: fvr.fan/rodneydarkchildjerkins

Rodney Roy Jerkins (born July 29, 1977), known professionally as Darkchild, is an American record producer, rapper, and songwriter. He has collaborated with a broad range of popular artists.

Jerkins has won two Grammy Awards from 19 nominations. Among his most successful productions are "The Boy Is Mine" by Brandy and Monica, "It's Not Right but It's Okay" by Whitney Houston, "You Rock My World" by Michael Jackson, "Say My Name" by Destiny's Child, "If You Had My Love" by Jennifer Lopez, "Déjà Vu" by Beyoncé, "Holler" by Spice Girls, "He Wasn't Man Enough" by Toni Braxton, "Telephone" by Lady Gaga, and "As Long as You Love Me" by Justin Bieber.

== Early life ==
Jerkins' father, Frederick, is an Evangelical pastor and his mother was a housekeeper. Jerkins began playing piano at age five. He would follow his brother and father, who both played at church gatherings.

Raised in Galloway Township, New Jersey, Jerkins is one of four children: two boys and two girls. His brother is fellow producer Fred Jerkins III. Jerkins attended Absegami High School, and identifies as a Christian.

At age 13, he was offered a chance to work at a studio in Atlantic City, but declined. At age 14, Jerkins was mentored by his idol, Teddy Riley, but he did not accept a contract offer to work with the producer due to an aspiration to build an "empire" without such support. He was also offered a chance to work at Bad Boy Records, but declined. At 16, he was approached by James Jones, formerly of Uptown Records, and moved in with him to Hackensack to work with him. One of their first sessions was with Patti LaBelle.

== Career ==
Jerkins' first recorded output was a "gospel rap" collaboration with his brother, Fred Jerkins III, entitled On the Move. He later incorporated the name "Darkchild", at the age of 17, subsequently accepting a worldwide publishing deal with the EMI Music Corporation. The producer then proceeded to establish a commercial music career, initially working with artists such as Joe, Mary J. Blige and Brandy. Jerkins' stated his first big projects were Blige's Share My World, Whitney Houston's It's Not Right but It's Okay, and Brandy and Monica's The Boy Is Mine.

Over the course of his career, Jerkins has formed a "camp" of songwriters, including his brother Fred Jerkins III, BLACKstreet Co-Founder Joe Stonestreet, LaShawn Daniels, Tony Kurtis , Keri Malena aka Malena ICON, Kenisha Pratt, Toni Estes, Aaron Washington, Anesha & Antea Birchett, Jordan Omley, Jon Jon Traxx, Tommy Brown, Delisha Thomas, Marvin Hemmings, Michael Mani, Kalenna Harper, Keli Nicole Price, Nora Payne, Michaela Shiloh, Isaac Phillips, Japhe Tejeda, LeToya Duggan, Mischke Butler, Andre Lindal, and Victoria Monét, among others.

In June 2025, Jerkins was inducted into the Songwriters Hall of Fame.

=== Production ===
Jerkins has produced and written for Brandy, Patti LaBelle, Joe, The Saturdays, Toni Braxton, Vanessa Williams, Will Smith, Keyshia Cole, Monica, Michael Jackson, Mariah Carey, Ayumi Hamasaki, Cher, Jessica Simpson, Jennifer Lopez, Ashanti, Aaliyah, Amerie, Ariana Grande, Britney Spears, Mary Mary, Kirk Franklin, Kierra Sheard, The Black Eyed Peas, Destiny's Child, Spice Girls, TLC, Janet Jackson, Danity Kane, Beyoncé, Linda Király, Lady Gaga, Cascada, Tamia, Pussycat Dolls, Whitney Houston, Natasha Bedingfield, Mary J. Blige, B5, Lionel Richie, Tiffany Evans, JYJ, Wonder Girls, Austin Brown, Kanye West, Katy Perry, Hikaru Utada, Keke Palmer, Hala Al Turk, Nelly Furtado, Justin Bieber, Brian McKnight and LMFAO.

In the 2010s, he produced songs for Mariah Carey, Leona Lewis, JLS, Kylie Minogue, Ayumi Hamasaki, The Saturdays. Jerkins was a music executive and mentor on season 10 of American Idol.

In 2013, Jerkins was hired on to be a producer for Michael Jackson's posthumous album Xscape. He originally worked on the title track for the album from 1999 to 2001. He is the only producer to work on the original version and reworking version of the title track.

When asked by Ryan Seacrest in 2013 the favorite people he's produced for, he said "Definitely The Saturdays. Without a doubt. I had a lot of fun working with them and was really impressed with their voices. They were very down to earth and I like that a lot in an artist. I wish them all the best in America and think they could end up as big as The Spice Girls."

In preparation for the 2014 FIFA World Cup opening ceremony, Jerkins produced a song featuring the Palestinian 2013 Arab Idol winner Mohammed Assaf.

In 2017, he produced Blind and Makings of You for Tamar Braxton.

== Record labels ==
In 1999, Jerkins joined Sony/Epic Records to promote singer Rhona Bennett, Pop/R&B girl group So Plush, and rapper Fats. Fats appeared on two tracks on which Jerkins produced for Michael Jackson's album Invincible, and So Plush released the single "Things I've Heard Before". Subsequently, So Plush's singles, "Damn" and "Things I've Heard Before", were pressed and made available as promos, and Rhona's self-titled album was released in Japan. In 2005, Darkchild Records reemerged when Jerkins signed acts including Shamari Fears, formerly of R&B group Blaque, female MC Asia Lee, dancehall artist Atiba, crossover act Natasha Bradley, and gospel singer Anesha Birchett.

In 2006, he was appointed VP of Artists & repertoire (A&R) for The Island Def Jam Group. Jerkins released his wife Joy Enriquez's second album Atmosphere of Heaven, which features a religious direction, on his independent gospel imprint JoyFul Child Records. The Darkchild name has been loaned to Darkchild Gospel, a record company run by Jerkins' brother, Fred Jerkins III.

Jerkins also founded Alienz Alive, a gospel label with a roster of faith-based artists including Christian rapper Jon Keith, Alex Jean, Hollyn, former Reach Records artist/producer Gawvi among others.

=== Music Mogul, Inc. ===
In late 2008, Jerkins joined Nicholas Longano, Ray Brown, and Jonathan E. Eubanks in creating Music Mogul, Inc. MusicMogul.com was an online portal where artists can communicate with their fans. Each quarter, members vote for the best video performances. The top performers were then flown to Los Angeles to compete in front of a panel of celebrity judges. The winner would get a demo deal with Darkchild Productions.

The site appears to be defunct as of 2024.

== Personal life ==
Jerkins has been married to singer Joy Enriquez since April 4, 2004. The two met when he worked on her debut album.

The couple has four children.

In 2015, his five-year-old daughter Heavenly Joy was a contestant on season 10 of America's Got Talent.

== Singles discography and other charted songs ==
Year	Song	Artist	Chart position		
Year	Song	Artist	R&B	Hot 100	UK
1995	"The Way That You Love" (Remix)	Vanessa Williams	23	67	52
1996	"The Things That You Do"	Gina Thompson	12	41	—
1997	"Yeah! Yeah! Yeah!"	Simone Hines	38	—	—
1997	"Don't Wanna Be a Player"	Joe	5	25	16
1997	"I Can Love You"	Mary J. Blige (featuring Lil' Kim)	2	28	—
1997	"Share My World"	Mary J. Blige	—	—	—
1997	"Searching"	Mary J. Blige (featuring Roy Ayers)	—	—	—
1998	"The Boy Is Mine"	Brandy & Monica	1	1	2
1998	"Angel of Mine"	Monica	2	1	55
1998	"Daydreamin'"	Tatyana Ali	6	5	3
1998	"All the Way (Freaky Style)"	Color Me Badd	—	—	—
1999	"If You Had My Love"	Jennifer Lopez	6	1	4
1999	"It's Not That Serious"	Jennifer Lopez	—	—	—
1999	"Sunshine"	Coko	19	70	—
1999	"Say My Name"	Destiny's Child	1	1	3
1999	"U Don't Know Me (Like U Used To)" (Darkchild Mix)	Brandy (featuring Shaunta & Da Brat)	25	79	—
1999	"Damn"	So Plush (featuring Ja Rule)	41	—	—
2000	"He Wasn't Man Enough"	Toni Braxton	1	2	5
2000	"Let Love Lead the Way"	Spice Girls	—	—	1
2000	"Holler"	Spice Girls	—	112	1
2000	"Shining Star"	Backstreet Boys	—	—	—
2000	"If I Told You That"	Whitney Houston & George Michael	—	—	9
2000	"Time Limit"	Hikaru Utada	—	—	—
2001	"I Sings"	Mary Mary (featuring BB Jay)	68	—	—
2001	"I Ain't the One"	Tyrese	68	—	—
2001	"You Rock My World"	Michael Jackson	13	10	2
2001	"Unbreakable"	Michael Jackson	—	—	—
2001	"Heartbreaker"	Michael Jackson	—	—	—
2001	"Invincible"	Michael Jackson	—	—	—
2001	"Privacy"	Michael Jackson	—	—	—
2001	"Threatened"	Michael Jackson	—	—	—
2001	"That's the Way"	Jennifer Lopez	—	—	—
2001	"Dame (Touch Me)" (duet with Chayanne)	Jennifer Lopez	—	—	—
2001	"Satisfied"	Rhona	—	—	—
2001	"Everything"	Canela	—	—	—
2001	"I Remember" (Remix)	Debelah Morgan	—	—	—
2001	"Celebrity"	*NSYNC	—	—	—
2002	"Overprotected" (Darkchild Remix)	Britney Spears	—	86	4
2002	"I Love Rock 'n' Roll"	Britney Spears	—	—	13
2002	"What About Us?"	Brandy	3	7	4
2002	"All Eyez on Me"	Monica	32	69	—
2002	"A Different Kind of Love Song" (Remix)	Cher	—	—	—
2002	"Get with Me"	3rd Storee	85	—	—
2002	"If You Only Knew"	Prymary Colorz	78	—	—
2002	"Turntable"	TLC	—	—	—
2003	"I'm Good"	Blaque	95	—	—
2003	"All I Do"	B5	71	—	—
2004	"You Don't Know"	Kierra "Kiki" Sheard	84	—	—
2004	"Lose My Breath"	Destiny's Child	10	3	2
2004	"One Wish"	Ray J	3	11	13
2004	"We've Had Enough"	Michael Jackson	—	—	—
2005	"Cater 2 U"	Destiny's Child	3	14	—
2005	"What I Need"	Ray J	58	—	—
2005	"Step Into My World"	Jennifer Lopez	—	—	—
2005	"I Got U"	Jennifer Lopez	—	—	—
2006	"Enough Cryin'"	Mary J. Blige	2	32	46
2006	"Hold Me Down"	Danity Kane	—	—	—
2006	"Need a Boss"	Shareefa	10	67	—
2006	"Cry No More"	Shareefa	43	—	—
2006	"Déjà Vu"	Beyoncé (featuring Jay-Z)	1	4	1
2006	"So Lonely"	Mariah Carey (featuring Twista)	65	—	—
2006	"The One You Need"	Megan Rochell (featuring Fabolous)	41	—	—
2006	"Heartbreak"	Megan Rochell	—	—	—
2006	"Can't Get Enough"	Tamia	26	—	—
2006	"Turn the Page"	Bobby Valentino	63	—	—
2006	"Make It Last Forever"	Ciara	—	—	—
2007	"Be with Me"	J. Holiday	83	—	—
2007	"Can't Leave 'Em Alone"	Ciara (featuring 50 Cent)	10	40	109
2007	"Shoulda Let You Go"	Keyshia Cole	6	41	—
2007	"Hey Hey Hey"	Natasha	—	—	—
2007	"So Sick"	Natasha	—	—	—
2007	"Feedback"	Janet Jackson	39	19	—
2008	"What Them Girls Like"	Ludacris (featuring Chris Brown & Sean Garrett)	17	33	—
2008	"I'm Grown"	Tiffany Evans (featuring Bow Wow)	98	—	—
2008	"Luv"	Janet Jackson	34	101	—
2008	"So Over You"	Ashanti	—	—	—
2008	"Angel"	Natasha Bedingfield	—	63	—
2008	"Right Here (Departed)"	Brandy	22	34	—
2008	"Long Distance"	Brandy	42	101	—
2008	"The Definition"	Brandy	116	—	—
2009	"I Look So Good (Without You)"	Jessie James	—	104	—
2009	"Girls"	Se7en (featuring Lil' Kim)	—	—	—
2009	"Make Me"	Janet Jackson	71	—	73
2009	"Telephone"	Lady Gaga (featuring Beyoncé)	—	3	1
2009	"The One"	Mary J. Blige (featuring Drake)	32	63	—
2009	"Pucker Up"	Ciara	—	—	—
2010	"Shake My"	Three 6 Mafia (featuring Kalenna)	—	75	—
2010	"Perfect Nightmare"	Shontelle	—	—	—
2010	"I Hate That You Love Me"	Dirty Money	—	—	—
2010	"Target Practice"	Austin Brown	—	—	—
2011	"The One You Call"	Keke Palmer	—	—	—
2011	"Ain't Nobody"	Mary J. Blige	—	—	—
2011	"What Are Words"	Chris Medina	—	83	—
2011	"Just Can't Get Enough"	The Black Eyed Peas	—	3	3
2011	"Stitch by Stitch"	Javier Colon	—	17	—
2011	"I Forgive You"	Kelly Clarkson	—	—	—
2011	"Turn the Lights Out"	Priscilla Renea	—	—	—
2012	"Big Hoops (Bigger the Better)"	Nelly Furtado	—	—	14
2012	"Spirit Indestructible"	Nelly Furtado	—	—	—
2012	"Parking Lot"	Nelly Furtado	—	—	—
2012	"Got Me Good"	Ciara	—	—	—
2012	"Die in Your Arms"	Justin Bieber	—	17	34
2012	"As Long as You Love Me"	Justin Bieber	116	6	22
2013	"Waiting for the Night"	Nelly Furtado	—	—	—
2013	"Bucket List"	Nelly Furtado	—	—	—
2013	"The Art of Letting Go"	Mariah Carey	46	—	—
2013	"Perfect World"	Tone Damli	—	—	—
2013	"My Heart Is Open"	Maroon 5 (featuring Gwen Stefani)	—	—	—
2013	"Roller Coaster"	Justin Bieber	—	—	—
2013	"Lease My Love"	The Saturdays	—	—	—
2013	"Read My Lips"	Ciara	—	—	—
2014	"Xscape"	Michael Jackson	—	—	—
2014	"Xscape (Original Version)"	Michael Jackson	—	—	—
2014	"Coulda Been Me"	Candice Glover	—	—	—
2014	Therapy	Mary J. Blige	—	—	—
2014	"Doubt"	Mary J. Blige	37	—	—
2014	"When You're Gone"	Mary J. Blige	—	—	—
2014	"You're Mine (Eternal)"	Mariah Carey	24	88	—
2017	"Blind"	Tamar Braxton	—	—	—
2018	"Dose"	Ciara	-	—	—
2018	"Hard Place"	H.E.R.	15	—	—
2018	"Just Say When"	Capital Cities	—	—	—
2018	"Rockin' Around the Christmas Tree"	Jessie J	—	—	—
2018	"Jingle Bell Rock"	Jessie J	—	—	—
2018	"This Christmas Day"	Jessie J	—	—	—
2018	"At Least I Know"	T.I. (featuring Anderson .Paak)	—	—	—
2018	"SWIZZMONTANA" (PROD. BY SWIZZ BEATZ)	Swizz Beatz & French Montana	—	—	—
2018	"3Way"	Teyana Taylor	—	—	—
2018	"Look Back at It"	A Boogie wit da Hoodie	25	27	—
2018	"Don't Sleep"	Chromeo (featuring French Montana and Stefflon Don)	—	—	—
2019	"Right Back"	Khalid (featuring A Boogie wit da Hoodie)	29	73	71
2019	"Playing Games"	Summer Walker	9	16	24
2022	"Shirt"	SZA	4	11	17
2022	"Forgiveless"	SZA (featuring Ol' Dirty Bastard)	35	76	—
2024	"Boy for a Day"	Kylie Cantrall	—	—	—

== Appearances and production discography ==
=== Notable productions ===
- 1995: Intro – "Strung Out On Your Lovin'"
- 1996: Aaliyah – "Everything's Gonna Be Alright"
- 1997: No Authority – "Don't Stop"
- 1998: Brandy and Monica – "The Boy Is Mine"
- 1998: Brandy – "Angel in Disguise"
- 1998: Monica – "Angel of Mine"
- 1998: Whitney Houston – "It's Not Right but It's Okay"
- 1999: Destiny's Child – "Say My Name"
- 1999: Chante Moore – "If I Gave Love"
- 1999: Jennifer Lopez – "If You Had My Love"
- 2000: Toni Braxton – "He Wasn't Man Enough"
- 2000: Spice Girls – "Holler"
- 2001: Michael Jackson – "You Rock My World"
- 2001: Michael Jackson – "Unbreakable"
- 2001: Britney Spears – "Overprotected" (The Darkchild Remix)
- 2001: Jessica Simpson – "I Never"
- 2001: Jessica Simpson – "Imagination"
- 2002: Brandy – "What About Us?"
- 2002: Monica – "All Eyez on Me"
- 2002: Monica – "Ain't Gonna Cry No More"
- 2002: TLC – "Turntable"
- 2004: Destiny's Child – "Lose My Breath"
- 2004: Tyra Banks – "Shake Ya Body"
- 2005: Destiny's Child – "Cater 2 U"
- 2006: Beyoncé (featuring Jay-Z) – "Déjà Vu"
- 2006: Ciara (featuring 50 Cent) – "Can't Leave 'em Alone"
- 2008: Tiffany Evans (featuring Bow Wow) – "I'm Grown"
- 2008: Janet Jackson – "Feedback"
- 2008: Brandy – "Right Here (Departed)"
- 2008: The Pussycat Dolls – "When I Grow Up"
- 2008: Beyoncé – "Scared of Lonely"
- 2009: Lady Gaga featuring Beyoncé – "Telephone"
- 2011: The Black Eyed Peas – "Just Can't Get Enough"
- 2011: Kelly Rowland (featuring Lil' Playy) – "Work It Man"
- 2012: Justin Bieber – "As Long as You Love Me"
- 2012: Leona Lewis – "Shake You Up"
- 2014: Mariah Carey – "You're Mine (Eternal)"
- 2014: Mary J. Blige – "A Night to Remember"
- 2014: Ariana Grande (featuring ASAP Ferg) – "Hands on Me"
- 2014: Sam Smith – "Stay with Me"
- 2014: Michael Jackson – "Xscape"
- 2017: Tamar Braxton – "Blind"
- 2018: Chromeo (featuring French Montana and Stefflon Don) – "Don't Sleep"
- 2017: Tamar Braxton – "The Makings of You"
- 2019: Baekhyun – "Diamond"
- 2021: NCT 127 – "Favorite (Vampire)"
- 2022: SZA – "Shirt"
- 2023: Kali Uchis – "Endlessly"
- 2023: Tori Kelly – "Cut"
- 2025: Jon Keith (featuring Alex Jean) – "Eyes on Us"
- 2025: ORYANE feat. FUZEEJASMINE – "My Luv"

=== Guest raps ===
- 1995: Hodge – "Head Nod" (Darkchild Remix)
- 1996: New Edition with AZ – "Something About You" (Darkchild Remix)
- 1997: Tasha Holiday – "Just The Way You Like It" (Darkchild Remix) with Lil' Cease, Peter Gunz and Mike Nitty
- 1997: MQ3 – "Everyday"
- 1997: Immature – "I Can't Wait" with Mike Nitty
- 1997: Mary J. Blige – "Everything" (Darkchild Remix) with Fat Joe
- 1997: K-Ball – "On the Weekend", "Love Matters"
- 1998: Kirk Franklin & The Nu Nation Project – "Revolution"
- 1998: Keith Washington – "Bring It On" (Darkchild Remix)
- 1999: Brandy – "Top of the World" (Darkchild Remix) with Fat Joe and Big Pun
- 2000: Natalie Wilson & The S.O.P. Chorale – "Act Like You Know" with LaShawn Daniels
- 2001: So Plush – "What You Do to Me" with 50 Cent and Fats, "Ain't My Fault"
- 2001: Rhona – "Satisfied" (Another Darkchild Remix) with Fats
- 2002: Jay Mathis – "Kiss" with Pain and Fats
- 2002: Mary Mary – "He Said" with Fats
- 2002: K-Young – "Ballinest Player" with Lil' Zal
- 2002: K-Young – "Ooh Wee"
- 2002: Shawn Desman – "Sexy"
- 2003: Natalie Wilson & The S.O.P. Chorale – "Good Life"
- 2004: Kierra "Kiki" Sheard – "You Don't Know"
- 2005: Joy Enriquez – "Don't You Let Go"
- 2005: Anesha Birchett – "Get Ready" with Mase
- 2005: Atiba – "Flossin" with Francisco
- 2006: The Darkchild Allstars – "We Are Family"
- 2007: Linda Király – "Can't Let Go"
- 2008: The Pussycat Dolls with Diddy, Lil Wayne, & Fatman Scoop – "When I Grow Up" (Darkchild Remix)

=== Unreleased tracks ===
- 1999: Michael Jackson – "Rampage"
- 2000: Destiny's Child – "Girl Like Me"
- 2000: Destiny's Child – "Everything"
- 2001: Michael Jackson – "Get Your Weight Off of Me"
- 2001: Michael Jackson – "Pressure"
- 2001: Michael Jackson – "The Pain"
- 2008: Lady Gaga – "Reloaded"
- 2011: Jennifer Lopez – "This Cannot Be Love"

=== Video cameos ===
- 1995: Hodge – "Head Nod" (Darkchild Remix)
- 1996: Gina Thompson (featuring Missy Elliott) – "The Things That U Do (Bad Boy Remix)"
- 1997: No Authority – "Don't Stop"
- 1998: Kirk Franklin & The Nu Nation Project – "Revolution"
- 1998: J'Son – "I Should've Cheat on You"
- 2000: So Plush – "Things I've Heard Before"
- 2001: Rhona – "Satisfied"
- 2002: Brandy – "What About Us?"
- 2002: Monica – "All Eyez on Me"
- 2006: Natasha – "Hey, Hey, Hey" and "So Sick"
- 2006: Shareefa – "Cry No More"
- 2006: J. Holiday – "Be with Me"
- 2008: Brandy – "Right Here (Departed)"

=== Web series ===
Jerkins is currently starring with Johnny Wright in a number of episodes of the YOBI.tv Take the Stage web series.
