= Get with Me =

Get With Me

Studio album by 3rd Storee
- Released: April 16, 2002
- Length: 49:24
- Label: Def Soul
- Producer: Paul D. Allen and Damon Thomas

Get With Me is the second studio album to be released by the R&B and hip hop group 3rd Storee, released on April 16, 2002 by Def Jam. The leading single track of the album "Get With Me", also features rapper Joe Budden The soulful ballad "I'm Sorry" was featured on the Rush Hour 2 soundtrack. "Superstar" was marketed as another single on the album's packaging promotion however didn't reach commercial success.

== Critical reception ==
Professional ratings
Review scores
Source	Rating
Vibe	2/5 stars

Vibe writer Laura Checkoway commended the production and the group's vocals but felt the tracks carried "underdeveloped lyrics" and choruses that were "more irritating than infectious", concluding that, "Even if you're a sucker for sweet faces, mindless melodies, and polished production, this album is less than the sum of its parts." AllMusic found that Get with Me "manages to repeatedly distinguish itself from the admittedly fierce competition [...] It's this kind of syncretism that lends 3rd Storee a distinctive sound, which is pretty much the key to the kingdom in the modern R&B game."

== Track listing ==
Get with Me track listing
No.	Title	Producer(s)	Length
1.	"Get With Me"	Rodney Jerkins	4:51
2.	"Clap Your Hands"	Nokio	4:16
3.	"Now I Can Breathe"	PAJAM	3:16
4.	"Superstar"	Nokio, D "Boogie" Morehead (co.)	3:45
5.	"I'm Sorry"	PAJAM	5:06
6.	"All Aboard"	Anthony President, Brainz Dimilo	3:18
7.	"Type of Mood"	Anthony President, Brainz Dimilo	3:53
8.	"What Would It Be Like"	The Underdogs	3:11
9.	"You Don't Want Me To"	Ian Prince	4:00
10.	"Don't Lose Hope"	PAJAM	3:20
11.	"How Can This Be"	PAJAM	4:58
12.	"Get With Me (Remix)" (featuring Joe Budden)	Rodney Jerkins	5:30
Total length:			49:24

== Charts ==
Weekly chart performance for Get with Me
Chart (2008)	Peak position
US Billboard 200	91
US Top R&B/Hip-Hop Albums (Billboard)	13
