= J'Son (singer) =

American R&B singer

J'son
- Birth name: Jason Tyrel Thomas
- Also known as: Jay Sonic, "J.T." "R&B Prince" "R&B King"
- Born: May 4, 1980 (age 45); South Central, Los Angeles
- Genres: R&B/Pop
- Occupation(s): Singer, Actor
- Years active: 1995-Present
- Labels: Hollywood Records, Def Soul, J Records

J'son (born Jason Tyrel Thomas; May 4, 1980) is an American R&B singer who was signed to Hollywood Records in the 1990s with three charting hits on the US Billboard Hot 100. He also scored two top 5 singles in New Zealand.

== Career ==
J'son grew up in South Central Los Angeles singing on the street corner for tips after school. He started singing at the age of eight in an attempt to gain his mother's attention, which is when his singing abilities were recognized. At the age of 13 J'son met Minetta D. Gammage who then introduced him to her business partner David Esterson, who helped get a record deal with Hollywood Records.

In 1995 J'son released his first single "Take A Look". The song peaked at #74 on the Billboard Hot 100, #26 on Billboard's Rhythmic Top 40 chart, #38 on Billboard's Hot Dance Music Club Play chart and #54 on Billboard's Hot R&B Singles chart. "Take A Look" was also a big hit in New Zealand in 1996, peaking at #2 and spending 10 non-consecutive weeks in the top 10. His second single "I'll Never Stop Loving You" peaked at #62 on the Billboard Hot 100, #38 on Billboard's Rhythmic Top 40 chart, and #57 on Billboard's Hot R&B Singles chart. It was also another major success for J'son in New Zealand, debuting at #8, and climbing to a peak of #4 in June 1996, giving J'son his second consecutive top five hit in the country. The song appeared on the "First Kid" movie soundtrack and it was covered by Britney Spears, appearing as the B-side to her single "(You Drive Me) Crazy". J'son's self-titled debut album was released on February 27, 1996 and peaked at #44 on Billboard's Heatseekers Albums chart. His song "Say That You're Ready" appeared on the Eddie movie soundtrack in 1996. A song titled "Down and Dirty was featured The 6th Man movie soundtrack in 1997.

In 1998, he released the single "I Should Cheat On You", the lead single from his sophomore album. The song peaked at #48 on Billboard's Hot R&B Singles chart, #72 on the Billboard Hot 100 and stayed on the chart for 13 weeks. Unfortunately due to the lackluster sells of the single, his second album was shelved. After leaving Hollywood records he joined the R&B boy band 3rd Storee (also known as Chapter 4) and released one album with them in 2002. Aside from music, J'son has done some acting, commercials, voice-overs and he appears in the movie “Honey” starring Jessica Alba who was he's childhood friend turned lover they later became boyfriend and girlfriend after Honey

After the group disbanded, J'Son reemerged in 2011 for brief moment appearing under a new stage name Jay Sonic in a new music video titled "Spazz Out", Directed by Nick Lovell and Cinematography by Matthew Griffith. In 2012 he made an on-air radio broadcast participating in a R&B cipher on Generation Bizzle Radio on their GenerationBizzleTV YouTube Channel, the vocal acts featured actress and singer Porscha Coleman along with artists Kolby Cordell, Tonez P & Jay Sonic.

== Discography ==
=== Albums ===
- J'Son (1996)

=== Singles ===
List of singles, with selected chart positions
Year	Single	Peak chart positions
Year	Single	US Billboard Hot 100
1995	"Take a Look"	74
1996	"I'll Never Stop Loving You"	62
1998	"I Should Cheat on You"	72

=== Soundtracks ===
- "I'll Never Stop Loving You" - First Kid Soundtrack (Walt Disney Pictures)
- "Say That You're Ready" - Eddie Soundtrack (Buena Vista Pictures)
- "Down and Dirty" - The 6th Man Soundtrack (Touchstone Pictures)

=== Unreleased Tracks ===
- "Truly Wait" - (Producer's Cut, Recorded before his official sign with Hollywood Records)
- "Baby Don't Run Away" - (Producer's Cut, Recorded before his official sign with Hollywood Records)
- "Spazz Out" - (2011 single and music video under the new stage name "Jay Sonic")

== See also ==
- Jason (name)
- J-Son
