= Massive Incorporated =

Subsidiary of Microsoft that implements dynamic advertising in video games

- Type: Subsidiary
- Industry: Advertising
- Founded: 2002; 24 years ago
- Founder: Mitch Davis
- Defunct: October 2010; 16 years ago
- Headquarters: New York City, New York, U.S.
- Key people: Mitch Davis (CEO); Craig Telfer (director of integration); Nick Gonzalez (Founding CTO); David Sturman (2003 thru Acquisition) (CTO); Claudia Batten Client Relations, Nicholas Longano CMO, Katherine Hayes COO
- Products: In-game advertising
- Parent: Microsoft (2006–2010)
- Website: No longer exists

Massive Incorporated was an American advertising company that provided software and services to dynamically host advertisements within video games. Massive Incorporated was purchased by Microsoft in May 2006 for approximately $200 million to $400 million.

The company closed down at the end of 2010.

== Service ==
The service, collectively known as The Massive Network, allows game developers to place advertisements within video games by providing a software development kit (SDK) and servers to host advertisements to be streamed to clients when the game is played. The streaming of advertisements allows old advertisements to be removed and more contextual ones applied in their place. Where games such as Need For Speed: Most Wanted had static advertisements for Cingular and Burger King, advertisements supplied by a streaming network allow for time-limited ads such as movie or TV show posters. Both the publisher and Massive can then continue to make money after the game has been sold.

The software is made so as to capture the proper demographic: it would be a problem to advertise an R-rated movie in a G-rated game or to place advertisements that conflict with a game's genre.

First, placement and layout of the advertisements is planned by the developers with help from Massive. Advertisements can be any texture, but to maintain realism, advertisements are generally placed on objects such as posters, billboards, storefronts, and other likely media. Massive calls this "Phase I: Design of the Inventory Elements."

Second, the SDK is integrated with the game to act as a client to Massive's ad servers. It allows the game to fetch the ad, display it on a surface, and analyze how the player acts around it. Massive refers to this as "Phase II: Integration of the Software Development Kit (SDK)."

Third is self-explanatory, "Phase III: Testing & Support." These are the software testing and deployment steps.

== See also ==
- In-game advertising
- Advergaming
