= Electric Café (En Vogue album) =

Studio album by En Vogue
- Released: April 6, 2018
- Recorded: 2016–2018
- Genre: R&B
- Length: 46:08
- Label: En Vogue; eOne
- Producer: Foster & McElroy; Dem Jointz; Modern Future; Kid Monroe; Raphael Saadiq; Taura Stinson; Curtis "Sauce" Wilson

En Vogue chronology
Soul Flower (2004)	Electric Café (2018)

Singles from Electric Café
- 1. "Deja Vu" Released: April 4, 2016; 2. "I'm Good" Released: May 3, 2017; 3. "Have a Seat" Released: November 17, 2017; 4. "Rocket" Released: December 1, 2017; 5. "Reach 4 Me" Released: August 10, 2018

Electric Café is the seventh studio album by American female vocal group En Vogue. It was released worldwide on April 6, 2018. Their first studio album in fourteen years, it marked their first full-length release through eOne Music and their own label, En Vogue Records. Material for Electric Café was originally conceived between 2014 and 2018. The trio reteamed with their founders Foster & McElroy to work on the majority of the album, with additional contribution coming from musicians Raphael Saadiq, Dem Jointz, Taura Stinson, Kid Monroe, Ne-Yo, and Curtis "Sauce" Wilson. Rapper Snoop Dogg appears as a guest vocalist. Musically, Electric Café contains a range of genres, blending a mix of neo soul, pop, and contemporary R&B with electronic dance music.

Upon its release, Electric Café received mixed reviews from critics, many of whom praised the band for their vocal performances but found the material too generic and uneven. In the United States, the album debuted at number 14 on Billboard's Independent Albums and reached the Top Album Sales chart. Elsewhere, it entered the UK Independent Albums chart. Electric Café was preceded by the single "Deja Vu", followed by "I'm Good" and "Have a Seat" as well as lead single "Rocket", the latter of which became their first top 10 hit on Billboard's Adult R&B Songs chart in over 20 years. In support of the album, En Vogue embarked on the two European concert tours, including the For the Love of Music Tour (2017) and the 2018 European Tour.

== Background ==
In 2009, the original members of En Vogue reunited and began their En Vogue: 20th Anniversary Tour. While the original quartet performed several spot dates in North America and the release of new music through Los Angeles-based Movemakers Entertainment and Funkigirl was announced. The group also appeared on A&E Private Sessions where they confirmed to be recording a new studio album. Following their reunion tour in the fall of 2011, Robinson decided not to record on the forthcoming studio album after failing to agree on business terms. On September 26, 2011, Ellis, Jones, and Herron released a single titled "I'll Cry Later" from their forthcoming album that was planned for release in December 2011. In May 2012, Jones also defected from the group after failing to agree on business terms involving En Vogue being signed to Rufftown Entertainment.

In June 2012, Bennett rejoined the group and continued to perform throughout the tour. In July 2014, the trio signed with Pyramid Records, and began filming the Lifetime musical Christmas movie An En Vogue Christmas (2014) for which they recorded the two original songs "Emotions" and "A Thousand Times" as well as a rendition of the Christmas standard "O Holy Night", all of which were later released on iTunes. Also that year, the band announced that they had started work on Electric Café, their first album of original material since Soul Flower. In April 2015, Rufftown released the extended play Rufftown Presents En Vogue, which contained four songs recorded by the lineup of Herron/Ellis/Jones during their time with the label (prior to 2012), including the shelved single "I'll Cry Later". In 2016, Herron and Ellis founded En Vogue Records and the band signed a distribution deal with eOne Music.

== Recording ==
En Vogue began recording material for Electric Café in 2014. The most lengthy process out of all the times the band worked on an album, much of it was written and recorded in "about two and a half years." Initially planned as an electronic dance music record, the trio reunited with their founders, producers Denzil Foster and Thomas McElroy, to have them spearhead the album. Each of their tracks were co-written by Bennett, Ellis, and Herron. Recording sessions with the duo were held at the FM Studios in Emeryville, California, though much of the vocals were recorded in Foster’s house. Herron described recording Electric Café different from previous albums, alluding to its transition from analog to digital recording. When asked about the process, she commented: "We didn’t go to a studio. We recorded in his house. He set a microphone up in a bedroom and he would sit in another room with his computer. We also didn’t have to spend as much time doing takes because so many producers want to use autotune.”

With recording postponed several times due to intense touring and further songwriters and producers such as Dem Jointz, Modern Future, Kid Monroe, Raphael Saadiq, and Taura Stinson joining the project, the record started to morph into a more traditional contemporary R&B and soul album. While Jointz and Stinson would contribute two tracks each, Saadiq collaborated with the band on his song "I'm Good" during recording at the Blakeslee Studios in North Hollywood. "Rocket", a song written by singer Ne-Yo and produced by Curtis "Sauce" Wilson, was the last song to be recorded for Electric Café. Speaking on the sound and title of the album, Herron elaborated: "The record kind of took on a life of its own, but we definitely stuck to our R&B roots. There are undertones of EDM, but we wanted to do a record that had a global feel to it – the record now has become more of a gumbo, a mix of different genres of music. But we loved the name Electric Café, from its dance days, so stuck with it."

== Critical reception ==
Professional ratings
Review scores
Source	Rating
AllMusic	3.5/5 stars
CommRadio	6/10 stars
SoulTracks	(recommended)
Spectrum Culture	3/5 stars

AllMusic editor Andy Kellman gave Electric Café three and a half out of five stars and called it "a whimsical yet surprisingly steady collection of material that continuously switches eras and styles with positive energy beaming all the way through it." He considered "the six songs the singers co-wrote with [McElroy and Foster] the most adventurous" and added: "Going strictly by the unfussy ease with which this enjoyable album seems to have been knocked out, one wouldn't know that the group's status was ever in doubt." SoulTracks critic Melody Charles found the album was "ambitious and enjoyable. In the ways that matter, En Vogue's trademark multiple leads and lush harmonies remain: each vocalist retains her distinct flavor throughout and the production." Guardian journalist Caroline Sullivan called the album "a freshly enlightened approach to songwriting and a crisp live set to show it all off."

Spectrum Culture's Dominic Griffin called Electric Café a "a jubilant comeback album produced and performed with palpable glee and inspiring self-confidence. It’s not an outsized attempt to present En Vogue to new listeners or a gambit to retake the charts. Instead, it’s an earnest, straightforward collection of songs." In her review for Australian online magazine Renowned for Sound, Rachael Scarsbrook wrote: "On more than one occasion, Electric Cafe loses a sense of cohesiveness needed for a comeback album, but it’s nice to see a heritage band still committed to making music all these years later. There are good tracks in amongst the filler, but this could potentially just be one for the existing fans wanting a trip down memory lane." PennState's CommRadio editor Scott Perdue declared the album a "a promising addition to En Vogue’s discography", and added: "While this album gets a little lost in its use of electric beats, a fair share of the songs have a strong presence on the album [...] Overall, Electric Café proves that En Vogue, while somewhat lost by time, hasn’t lost their relevance and is on the track to regaining their presence on the current music landscape."

== Chart performance ==
In the United States, Electric Café debuted and peaked at number 14 on the Billboard Independent Albums chart in the issue dated April 21, 2018. This marked En Vogue's first charting since Soul Flower (2004) which had peaked at number 15 in March 2004. While it became En Vogue's first album not to enter the Top R&B/Hip-Hop Albums, Electric Café also reached number 69 on Billboard's Top Album Sales chart. Internationally, the album reached the upper half of the UK Independent Albums, peaking at number 47.

Electric Café spawned several singles. The album was preceded by the buzz single "Deja Vu", released in 2016, followed by two further promotional singles, "I'm Good" and "Have a Seat" featuring Snoop Dogg, both released in 2017. Lead single "Rocket," released in December 2017, reached number 10 on the US Adult R&B Songs in the week ending May 3, 2018, becoming En Vogue's first top 10 hit since "Don't Let Go (Love)" spent six weeks in the top 10 in February and March 1997. It was ranked 25th on the Adult R&B Songs year-end chart. Fifth and final single "Reach 4 Me", issued in August 2018, peaked at number 16 on the Adult R&B Songs.

== Track listing ==
Electric Café – Standard edition
No.	Title	Writer(s)	Producer(s)	Length
1.	"Blue Skies"	Rhona Bennett; Terry Ellis; Denzil Foster; Cindy Herron; Thomas McElroy	Foster & McElroy	5:24
2.	"Deja Vu"	Bennett; Ellis; Foster; Herron; McElroy	Foster & McElroy	4:34
3.	"Rocket"	Shaffer Smith; Curtis Wilson	Curtis "Sauce" Wilson	3:51
4.	"Reach 4 Me"	Dwayne Abernathy; Isabella Peschardt	Dem Jointz	3:50
5.	"Electric Café"	Bennett; Ellis; Foster; Herron; McElroy	Foster & McElroy	4:34
6.	"Life"	Bennett; Ellis; Foster; Herron; McElroy	Foster & McElroy; Modern Future^{[A]}	4:09
7.	"Love the Way"	Bennett; Ellis; Foster; Herron; McElroy	Foster & McElroy; Modern Future^{[A]}	3:48
8.	"Oceans Deep"	Abernathy; Candice Pillay	Dem Jointz; Foster & McElroy^{[B]}	3:18
9.	"Have a Seat" (featuring Snoop Dogg)	Kid Monroe; Taura Stinson; Calvin Broadus, Jr.	Monroe; Stinson^{[C]}	3:49
10.	"I'm Good"	Raphael Saadiq; Stinson	Saadiq; Stinson^{[C]}	4:05
11.	"So Serious"	Bennett; Ellis; Foster; Herron; McElroy	Foster & McElroy	4:46
Total length:				46:08

Electric Café – Bonus track edition
No.	Title	Writer(s)	Producer(s)	Length
12.	"Have a Seat" (no-rap version)	Monroe; Stinson	Monroe; Stinson^{[C]}	3:33

Electric Café – Japanese edition
No.	Title	Writer(s)	Producer(s)	Length
12.	"Luv My Thangz"	Foster; Abernathy	Foster & McElroy; Dem Jointz^{[A]}	3:11
Total length:				49:25

Notes

- ^{^[A]} denotes co-producer
- ^{^[B]} denotes vocal producer
- ^{^[C]} denotes additional producer

== Credits and personnel ==
Credits adapted from AllMusic.

- Dwayne Abernathy – composition
- Rhona Bennett – composition
- Gerry Brown – mixing
- Bobby Campbell – mixing
- Kevin KD Davis – mixing
- Dem Jointz – engineering, production
- Terry Ellis – composition, executive production
- Denzil Foster – composition, engineering, executive production, production, vocal production
- Paul Grosso – art direction, design
- Koen Heldens – mixing
- Cindy Herron – composition, executive production
- Hotae Alexander Jang – engineering, vocal production
- Diallobe Johnson – production
- Thomas McElroy – composition, engineering, executive production, production, vocal production
- Kid Monroe – composition, production
- Jake Nochimow – production
- Isabella Peschardt – composition
- Candice Pillay – composition
- Zachary Rubin Rattet – production
- Steve Rusch – engineering
- Raphael Saadiq – composition, instrumentation, production
- Shaffer Smith – composition
- Snoop Dogg – vocals
- Taura Stinson – composition, production, vocal production
- Curtis "Sauce" Wilson – composition, engineering, production

== Charts ==
Chart (2018)	Peak position
UK Independent Albums (OCC)	47
US Independent Albums (Billboard)	14
US Top Album Sales (Billboard)	69

== Release history ==
Electric Café release history
Region	Date	Format	Label	Ref
Worldwide	April 6, 2018	Digital download; CD	En Vogue; eOne	
Japan	May 23, 2018	CD	eOne	
