= 3rd Storee =

American R&B group

- Also known as: "Chapter 4"
- Origin: Los Angeles, California, US
- Genre: R&B
- Years active: 1997–2007, 2018–present
- Label: Elektra Records Def Soul/Universal J Records (under the band name CHAPTER 4)
- Past members: D-Smoove; Kevonté; Jay-R; K. Young (formerly Lil' Man); (1999–2001, 2018) Gavyn (2001–2007, 2019) J'Son (2001–2007, 2019)

3rd Storee is an American R&B group that was active in the late 1990s and early 2000s. Their debut single, "If Ever", peaked at No. 7 on the UK Singles Chart in June 1999. The group was best known in the mid-1990s for their gold-certified single "If Ever" and "Party Tonight" featuring Treach of the hip-hop duo, Naughty By Nature and RL of NEXT as well as their mature second iteration of the group appearance on the Rodney Jerkins produced single and music video "Get With Me" feat. Joe Budden.

== Career ==
3rd Storee was formed during 1997 in South Central Los Angeles. The original line up consisted of members Kevonté, Lil' Man, D'Smoove and Jay-R. As a quartet they almost immediately made a breakthrough when they were signed to Edmonds Entertainment, and put on tour with Britney Spears. Owing to the success of the tour, 3rd Storee was then invited to open for 'N Sync on a national US tour, before visiting Europe for the first time during 1998, without even releasing an album.

In 1998 "If Ever" was released and peaked at No. 11 on the Billboard R&B chart and No. 7 on the UK Singles Chart. A second single "Party Tonight" was released in 1999 and their debut album was never released. A few years later band member Lil' Man left the group and the group continued to seek to replace and add a new member.

2001, led 3rd Storee to sign with Def Soul Records and R&B solo vocalist J'Son joined the band along with newcomer Gavyn Rhones, The group then released their second album titled Get With Me in 2002, and the lead single and music video of the same name was promoted across the media. The single also featured Joe Budden who provided rap verses. "Get With Me" placed at No. 71 on the Billboard Hip-Hop/R&B Single Sales Chart for one week. Another track on the album titled "I'm Sorry" was featured on the Rush Hour 2 soundtrack. In 2003, 3rd Storee appeared as actors on the dance film Honey and also provided the theme song ("Honey" featuring clipse) for the soundtrack. The group also made a cameo appearance in an episode of the animated series The Proud Family. In 2004, 3rd storee eventually signed under J. Records after a brief hiatus initially renaming the group as '360' before switching their name to S5 (Storee 5). At this time they released a promotional single titled "Ooh That Ass" produced by The Underdogs.

In 2005, Kevontay made his departure from the group and 3rd Storee attempted on a new venture with J. Records under a new band name titled Chapter 4. The band Chapter 4 only consists four out of six of the 3rd Storee members: Gavyn as lead vocalist, D-Smoove, Jay-R and J'Son. They released a four-track promotional EP album sampler along with a music video for their lead single "Fool With U", which Omarion later covered.

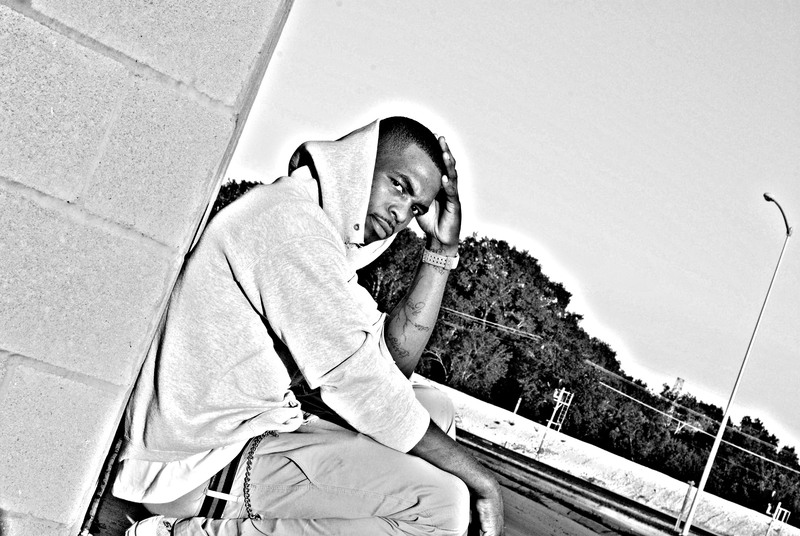
Kevontay Jackson, a member of 3rd Storee who went on to TV fame

After the short lived journey with Chapter 4, the band members decided to take a break from recording as a group and went on the different avenues. Kevontay became an actor and appeared in various television shows and films, but is most known playing the role of Jerome on the comedy series Everybody Hates Chris, who was also known for his catchphrase "Hey, little dude from across the street, let me hold a dollar". In 2016, he was a featured actor on the web series "Spook Hunters" from Bullz Eye Entertainment and appeared in the 2018 TV film biopic Whitney, portraying the gangbanger who killed Bobby Brown's brother-in-law Steven Sealy. While Jay-R continued to write and produce songs for other artists. Past 3rd Storee bandmate Lil' Man, now known as K. Young, went on the continue his solo career. Dante Clark (D-Smoove) briefly acted in guest appearance roles on Boston Public & City Guys. He later became a production manager/coordinator for various television shows. J'son continued entertainment going under the name Jay Sonic and became an actor and done voice overs for commercials. Gavyn became a solo artist and was featured on various artist music, he also vocal produced for Keyshia Cole album 11:11. He also toured with many acts as well as serving as a temporary lead singer with The Gap Band.

In a summer 2017 interview on YouTube with Black Hollywood Live, Kevontay discussed he would hope a 3rd Storee reunion would happen. He was in doubt about an attempt to start a solo career, but it did not come to happen, however he did started rapping. In the meanwhile he expressed he rather be more behind the scenes with entertainment with future projects as well as develop an animated series, which he later would reprise his role voice acting as the street hustler, Jerome on the reboot animated sequel Everybody Still Hates Chris on Comedy Central in 2024.

In a fall 2017 social media post, Jay-R hinted a reunion of the original 3rd Storee members with a recent photo of all 4 bandmates together, citing "Don't Forget, we're coming!!!", with the hashtags explaining that "nothing can break their bond".

In May 2018, the original four members (K. Young/Lil' Man, Jay-R, Kevontay and D-Smoove) released their new independent single "Leave Ur Man" featuring Bad Lucc (of Dubb Union) on internet streaming services. This is K-Young's return since his departure from the group in 2000.

3rd Storee has since returned along with all five members from their second album (Get With Me, including members J'son and Gavyn) releasing another independent single in December 2019. The soulful ballad titled "Get Back to Love Again" made way into internet music streaming services.

In 2026, Gavyn Rhone joined a collective in Los Angeles called the Top Shelf Band and teamed up with creative director and choreographer Tony Michaels as the duo GaTone, an artist development company providing vocal coaching and producing. Gavyn also made an appearance on Verzuz featuring Tank vs Tyrese, serving as a background vocalist for Tank. In the days leading up to the event, it was announced and hinted through Jay-R's social media that the band will be regrouping with members Dante, Kevontay and J'Son, posting an old picture with the mentioned members with a quote stating: "Throwback....but not for long!" as it may appear as Gavyn and K. Young are most likely involved in other entertainment endeavors at the moment.

=== Solo ventures ===
Aside from an effort to release new material from the band, a few members continued with solo releases:

- Lil' Man (also as artist name K. Young ) previously released his first album in 2005 titled "Learn How To Love". Years later, he released a few EPs through Treacherous Records: "Keep Talking About Love" (2011), "Distinguish" (2012) "Lay You Down" (2014/2019), "Married To The Money" (2018)The track "This Time" (2019)
- Kevontay Jackson (as artist name K. Jackson) released a rap single "Last Man Standing" on streaming services and music video in 2019. He released the track "Scumbag" on May 5, 2020, from his upcoming EP, The Experiment, a song he wrote while he was with the band. Jackson played the character of 'Jerome 'on the sitcom "Everybody Hates Chris" and reprised his role voice acting on the animated sitcom "Everybody Still Hates Chris"
- J'son (as artist name Jay Sonic), Post-teenage years of being a previous solo vocalist J'son, he briefly made a quick appearance going under the new stage-name 'Jay Sonic' and released a music video titled "Spazz Out" (2011). He was later seen in a 2012 independent local radio show showcasing his R&B vocal ability while freestyling, however no new music have been released since.
- Gavyn (as artist name Gavyn Rhone), released tracks such as "Jealous" (2010), "When You Cry" (2011) -Produced by Mario Winans. And released "Catch a Vibe" & "Dance For Me" (2020)
- Jay-R (as artist name Jay-R Reed), revamped his solo ventures back into the music scene after a brief hiatus of songwriting for various artists, he released previous recorded music but new to the public on music streaming services along with plans to record and release new music and an upcoming EP titled "Pieces" (2020). His first released single "Curl Them Toes" made its official debut in early May 2020, followed by a double release of singles "10 Positions" & "D.U.I."., A music video for D.U.I. was released July 2020.

== Members and lineup chronology ==
- Kevontay (born Kevontay Jackson)
- Lil' Man AKA K-Young (born Kenneth Pratt)
- D'Smoove (born Dante Clark)
- Jay-R (born Barry Reed Jr.)
- Gavyn (born Gavyn Rhone)
- J'Son (born Jason Tyrel Thomas)

3RD STOREE / CHAPTER 4	YEARS ACTIVE													
Band Member	1997	1998	1999	2000	2001	2002	2003	2004	2005	2006	2007	2008-2017	2018	2019
Lil Man (Lead Vocals) (1999 - 2001), (2018)	3rd Storee (Debut album)								H			H	"Leave Ur Man" SIngle (Released May 15)	
Kevontay Jackson (Vocals) (1999–2005), (2018–2019)	3rd Storee (Debut album) & (Get Wit me)							S5 ("Ooh That Ass") (J Records) single	I			I	"Leave Ur Man" SIngle	"Get Back to Love Again" Single (Released Dec. 23)
D-Smoove (Vocals, Rapper) (1999–2007), (2018–2019)	3rd Storee (Debut album) & (Get Wit me)							S5 ("Ooh That Ass") (J Records) single	A	CHAPTER 4 (J Records) sampler album		A	"Leave Ur Man" SIngle	"Get Back To Love Again" Single
Jay-R (Lead Vocals) (1999–2007), (2018–2019)	3rd Storee (Debut album) & (Get Wit me)							S5 ("Ooh That Ass") (J Records) single	T	CHAPTER 4 (J Records) sampler album		T	"Leave Ur Man" SIngle	"Get Back To Love Again" Single
J'Son (Lead Vocals) (2001–2007, 2019)					3rd Storee (Get Wit Me)			S5 ("Ooh That Ass") (J Records) single	U	CHAPTER 4 (J Records) sampler album		U		"Get Back To Love Again" Single
Gavyn (Lead Vocals) (2001–2007, 2019)					3rd Storee (Get Wit Me)			S5 ("Ooh That Ass") (J Records) single	S	CHAPTER 4 (J Records) sampler album		S		"Get Back To Love Again" Single

== Discography ==
=== Albums ===
- The 3rd Storee - 1999 (Unreleased)
- Get With Me - 2002 - U.S. #45
- Chapter 4 - (EP Album under the new band name Chapter 4)

=== Singles ===
As 3rd Storee

- "If Ever" - 1999
- "Party Tonight" (featuring Treach and RL) - 1999
- "Get With Me" (remix) featuring Joe Budden - 2002
- Honey feat. Clipse (Honey film soundtrack)
- "Leave Ur Man" (featuring Bad Lucc) - Magicink/COB - released May 15, 2018
- "Get Back To Love Again" - December 23, 2019

As Chapter 4

- "Fool With U" (under the new band name "CHAPTER 4") - J. Records 2006

=== Chapter 4 sampler track listing ===
1. Fool With You
2. Waiting On My Baby
3. Lights On (Featuring Scott Storch and Fabolous)
4. Should've Thought Twice

=== Unreleased songs ===
As 3rd Storee

- "The After Party" (Follow up to "Party Tonight") - The 3rd Storee Album
- "If Ever" (Pop Radio Mix) - The 3rd Storee Album
- "If Ever" feat. Harlem World (So So Def Remix) - King Triple Exe Session 4: The Passion of 90's R&B Album

As S5

- "Ooh That Ass" (unreleased promo under new name change "S5") - J. Records 2004

As Chapter 4

- "2 Piece Juicy" (unreleased from Chapter 4)

=== Music videos ===
- "If Ever"
- "Party Tonight"
- "Honey" - Promotional Video for the movie "Honey"
- "Get With Me"
- "Fool With U" (credited as Chapter 4)
