= Reach 4 Me =

2018 song by American recording group En Vogue

Single by En Vogue

from the album Electric Café
- Released: August 10, 2018
- Length: 3:50
- Label: En Vogue; eOne
- Songwriters: Dwayne Abernathy; Isabella Peschardt
- Producer: Dem Jointz

En Vogue singles chronology
"Rocket" (2017)	"Reach 4 Me" (2018)

"Reach 4 Me" is a song by American recording group En Vogue. Written by Dwayne Abernathy and Isabella Peschardt, "Reach 4 Me" was produced by Abernathy under his pseudonym Dem Jointz and released as the second single from their seventh studio album Electric Café (2018). In the United States, the song peaked at number 16 on Billboard's Adult R&B Songs chart, making it the second top 20 appearance by a single from Electric Café.

== Chart performance ==
"Reach 4 Me" debuted at number 29 on the US Billboard Adult R&B Songs in the week of August 18, 2018. In its second week on the chart, "Reach 4 Me" rose to number 28. In the week ending September 8, 2018, "Reach 4 Me" re-entered the chart at number 22, where it remained the following week. For the week ending September 22, 2018, "Reach 4 Me" peaked at number 20. The week of September 29, 2018, "Reach 4 Me" reached a new peak of 19. The week of October 13, 2018, "Reach 4 Me" peaked at number 18 on the Adult R&B Songs chart. The following week of October 20, 2018, "Reach 4 Me" reached a new peak of number 16 on the Adult R&B Songs chart.

== Promotion ==
A lyric video for "Reach 4 Me" premiered online on November 16, 2018.

== Credits and personnel ==
Credits adapted from AllMusic.

- Dwayne Abernathy – composition
- Rhona Bennett – composition
- Dem Jointz – engineering, production
- Terry Ellis – composition
- Koen Heldens – mixing
- Cindy Herron – composition
- Isabella Peschardt – composition

== Charts ==
Chart (2018)	Peak position
US Adult R&B Songs (Billboard)	16
