= Rhona (album) =

Studio album by Rhona
- Released: June 20, 2001
- Length: 55:24
- Label: Darkchild; Epic
- Producer: Fred "Uncle Freddie" Jerkins III; Rodney "Darkchild" Jerkins; Dan Shea; Robert Smith; Cory Rooney

Rhona chronology
| Rhona (2001) | Instant Classic (2024) |

Singles from Rhona
- 1. "Satisfied" Released: March 2001; 2. "The Meaning of Love" Released: 2001

Rhona is the debut studio album by American singer Rhona Bennett. It was released on June 20, 2001, by Darkchild and Epic Records.

== Background ==
Bennett began performing at age 11 with ETA Creative Arts Theater. At first trying her hand at acting, in 1991, she became a Mouseketeer on Disney Channel's The Mickey Mouse Club, before joining a spin-off dramedy called Emerald Cove on the network. After the show ended in 1995, she moved to California, appearing on Living Single and Martin, and landed regular role on UPN's Homeboys in Outer Space and the WB's sitcom The Jamie Foxx Show. Also trying to establish herself as a singer, she began writing and recording solo material when her manager suggested that one of her songs would be suitable for Whitney Houston's 1998 album My Love Is Your Love. He arranged a meeting with Rodney Jerkins, one of the producers on Houston's project, and although her song was not selected for the album, the presentation led to a record deal with Jerkins' own label, Darkchild Records.

== Release and promotion ==
"Satisfied," co-written by Bennett, was selected and released as the album's lead single. Issued in March 2001, became a top five hit on the US Hot Dance Club Play chart the following month, but failed to chart or sell noticeably elsewhere. Following a promotional world trip, further plans to release Rhona were put on hold after a fallout between Sony Music and Darkchild Records. Consequently, the album received a limited Japan-wide release only and Bennett was soon dropped from the label.

== Critical reception ==
Professional ratings
Review scores
| Source | Rating |
|---|---|
| AllMusic | 2/5 stars |

Denise Albert, writing for The Philippine Star, noted that "listening through Rhona's self-titled, 11-track debut album, it's apparent that she has the makings of a future superstar. Blessed with an amazing vocal range, Rhona takes on each funk-filled track with the ease of a music veteran [...] Her remake of the popular ballad "I Wanna Know What Love Is" will undoubtedly grab the hearts of sentimental Filipinos as well. Rhona's voice truly soars on this track. The other tracks on this album are tinged with funky, groovy pop sounds. Die-hard pop and R&B fans will love this album." AllMusic editor Paul Clifford gave the album two out of five stars. He found that the "12-song set draws from a wealth of musical styles, and on first listening sounds quite diverse. However, on closer inspection, it appears to be another well-oiled production from the Darkchild conveyor belt. The standout track is "Best of Me," which features the distinctive Darkchild synthesized strings and the ever-wonderful vocal arrangements of LaShawn Daniels."

== Commercial performance ==
In Japan, Rhona peaked at number 37 on the Oricon Albums Chart, spending five weeks on the chart.

== Track listing ==
Rhona track listing
| No. | Title | Writer(s) | Producer(s) | Length |
|---|---|---|---|---|
| 1. | "Satisfied" | Rhona Bennett; Rodney Jerkins; Fred Jerkins III; LaShawn Daniels; Mischke Butler | R. Jerkins; Daniels^{[a]}; Butler^{[a]} | 4:22 |
| 2. | "The Best of Me" | R. Jerkins; F. Jerkins; Daniels | R. Jerkins; Daniels^{[a]} | 4:33 |
| 3. | "Take What Comes to You" | R. Jerkins; F. Jerkins; Daniels; Butler | R. Jerkins; Daniels^{[a]} | 3:52 |
| 4. | "The First Time" | Phil Gladston; Gordon Chambers | R. Jerkins; Robert Smith; Cory Rooney; Dan Shea; Daniels^{[a]}; Butler^{[a]} | 5:19 |
| 5. | "Last Goodbye" | R. Jerkins; F. Jerkins; Smith; Daniels; Butler | R. Jerkins; Smith; Rooney; Shea; Butler^{[a]} | 4:20 |
| 6. | "Time Will Tell" | F. Jerkins; Smith; Daniels; Butler; Toni Estes | R. Jerkins; Smith; Daniels^{[a]}; Butler^{[a]} | 5:02 |
| 7. | "Miss the Way" | R. Jerkins; F. Jerkins; Daniels; Carmen Lampson; Samuel Hopkins | F. Jerkins; Daniels^{[a]} | 4:01 |
| 8. | "I Will" | R. Jerkins; F. Jerkins; Daniels; Butler; Lampson; Hopkins; Harvey Mason; Lee Jerkins Jr. | R. Jerkins; Rooney; Shea; Daniels^{[a]} | 4:56 |
| 9. | "I Want to Know What Love Is" | Mick Jones | R. Jerkins; Rooney; Shea | 4:40 |
| 10. | "Look to the Sky" | F. Jerkins; Smith; Daniels; Butler | R. Jerkins; Daniels^{[a]} | 4:31 |
| 11. | "The Meaning of Love" | F. Jerkins; Daniels | R. Jerkins; Daniels^{[a]} | 4:28 |
| 12. | "Satisfied" (Another Darkchild Remix) | Bennett; R. Jerkins; F. Jerkins; Daniels; Butler | R. Jerkins; Daniels^{[a]}; Butler^{[a]} | 4:28 |
| Total length: | | | | 55:24 |

Notes

- ^{^[a]} signifies vocal producer(s)

== Personnel ==
Credits adapted from the liner notes of Rhona.

Technical

- Mischke Butler – vocal producer
- LaShawn Daniels – vocal producer
- Fred "Uncle Freddie" Jerkins III – producer
- Rodney "Darkchild" Jerkins – producer
- Dan Shea – producer
- Robert Smith – producer
- Cory Rooney – producer

== Charts ==
Weekly chart performance for Rhona
| Chart (2001) | Peak position |
|---|---|
| Japanese Albums (Oricon) | 37 |

== Release history ==
Release dates and formats for Rhona
| Region | Date | Format(s) | Label(s) | Ref. |
|---|---|---|---|---|
| Japan | June 20, 2001 | CD; cassette | Darkchild; Epic | |
