= It's Not Right but It's Okay =

1999 single by Whitney Houston

Single by Whitney Houston

from the album My Love Is Your Love
- A-side: "Heartbreak Hotel" (Japan only)
- B-side: "Get It Back"
- Released: February 15, 1999
- Recorded: August 1998
- Studio: Crossway (Mendham, New Jersey)
- Genre: R&B; neo soul; funk; house
- Length: 4:52 (album version); 4:22 (radio and video version)
- Label: Arista
- Songwriters: LaShawn Daniels; Rodney Jerkins; Fred Jerkins III; Isaac Phillips; Toni Estes
- Producer: Darkchild

Whitney Houston singles chronology
"Heartbreak Hotel" (1998)	"It's Not Right but It's Okay" (1999)	"My Love Is Your Love" (1999)

Music video
- "It's Not Right but It's Okay" on YouTube

"It's Not Right but It's Okay" is a song recorded by American singer Whitney Houston for her fourth studio album, My Love Is Your Love. It was written by LaShawn Daniels, Rodney "Darkchild" Jerkins, Fred Jerkins III, Isaac Phillips, Toni Estes and produced by Darkchild. First issued as the b-side to "Heartbreak Hotel" in December 1998, it was officially released as the third single off My Love Is Your Love on February 15, 1999, by Arista Records. "It's Not Right but It's Okay" examines a woman confronting her lover about his infidelity.

The song was remixed by several remixers and producers, most notably Thunderpuss, whose version eventually made it to mainstream radio stations. It's also notable for its popular music video, which featured Houston in a strapless black leather gown designed by Gianfranco Ferré, sleek bob hairstyle, choker, and dark makeup, a stark contrast from Houston's previous, more elegant looks in past music videos.

The song was a success on the charts, first charting on the US Billboard dance and R&B charts as a promotional single. On the Dance Club Play chart, with its Thunderpuss remix, it became Houston's sixth number one single in January 1999, staying for three weeks, becoming her most successful single on the chart in her lifetime, spending 14 cumulative weeks on the chart. It was Houston's longest-charting single on the Hot R&B Singles & Tracks chart, staying on the charts for 30 cumulative weeks, reaching a peak of number seven in July 1999. On the Billboard Hot 100, due to mainstream radio airplay of the Thunderpuss version, the song shot to number four, becoming Houston's 21st career top-10 hit. In Spain, it became Houston's fourth career chart-topper. The song reached the top five in Canada, Iceland, Poland and the United Kingdom, while also reaching the top 10 in Italy and the Netherlands and the top 20 in Sweden, Switzerland, Germany and Austria. Its success in Europe helped to land it inside the top 10 on the Eurochart Hot 100.

Houston won the Grammy Award for Best Female R&B Vocal Performance and the International Dance Music Award for Best Pop 12" Dance Record for the song in 2000.

In 2025, to commemorate the 25th anniversary of the original song's release, Houston's former record label Arista released another official house remix of the song by remixer Felix Jaehn. This version became a hit, reaching the charts in Estonia, Croatia, Israel and the Czech Republic, reaching number one in the lattermost country, marking Houston's first number-one single in the region and her first official number one single of the 2020s.

In 2003, Q Magazine ranked "It's Not Right but It's Okay" at number 638 in their list of the "1001 Best Songs Ever". In 2019, Billboard listed it as one of the Greatest Songs of 1999. In 2022, the Thunderpuss club mix was listed in the list of the 200 greatest dance songs of all time on Rolling Stone. In 2025, Billboard listed the song in its 100 Best Dance Songs of All Time list as well as its 100 Best LGBTQ Anthems of All Time list. The song has also been cited by Forbes, Entertainment Weekly and About.com as one of Houston's best songs in her catalog.

== Background and development ==
By August 1998, Houston had established herself as one of the best selling music artists of all time with three multiplatinum studio albums and two multiplatinum soundtrack albums. In between 1992 and 1997, Houston had taken a break from studio work to establish her film career. At one point, Houston's mentor and label boss Clive Davis wrote a letter opining that Houston hadn't made a studio album in "less than seven years" and she felt her movie work had her "missing in action".

That month, Houston recorded the gospel-pop ballad, "When You Believe", from The Prince of Egypt, which was later released as a duet between Houston and fellow pop-R&B artist Mariah Carey. While in Beverly Hills, Houston met up with Davis at the latter's bungalow at The Beverly Hilton and asked the Arista CEO to play her the songs that were being submitted for a much-anticipated greatest hits album.

One of the songs played was producer Rodney Jerkins' "It's Not Right but It's Okay". Jerkins had wanted to work with Houston since he was sixteen. Upon hearing of the musician's desire to work with Houston, Davis asked the teenager to play him a song he was working on, afterwards Davis criticized the composition but encouraged him to improve his music.

By 1998, Jerkins had found success working on material for Aaliyah, Joe and Brandy, with Jerkins having recently scored a number one hit with the latter artist on her and Monica's duet "The Boy Is Mine". Davis hired Jerkins to work on Monica's album, also titled The Boy Is Mine, where Jerkins eventually produced Monica's hit rendition of "Angel of Mine", which later topped the Billboard Hot 100.

Jerkins eventually got his wish to work with Houston after sending Davis the demo of "It's Not Right". The song was co-composed by his Darkchild production team, which included his brother Fred Jerkins III, cousin LaShawn Daniels and longtime friend Isaac Phillips along with singer-songwriter Toni Estes, who sang on the demo track. When Houston heard it, according to Davis, to his amazement, she "had learned the lyrics and she started singing — with each playback she started over and it wasn’t long before she totally owned [the song] finding meaning I’m sure the composers never even suspected was there."

== Recording and production ==
=== Original Rodney Jerkins version ===
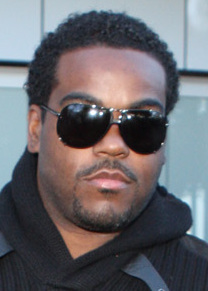
Rodney Jerkins (pictured in 2013) produced the original version of "It's Not Right but It's Okay".

Houston had returned from a ten-date tour of Europe when Jerkins was sent to Houston's Crossway recording studio located near her residence at Mendham Township, New Jersey. According to Jerkins, Houston told him she wasn't ready to record due to contracting bronchitis. Jerkins claimed it took "four days" before Houston finally emerged at the studio but during those four days, he got to spend time with Houston. According to Jerkins, one of the first things Houston told him was, "you're a church boy, ain't you", with Jerkins noting that Houston likely recognized some gospel-inflected chords in the song's demo.

On one of those days, Houston asked Jerkins, whose father was a preacher, for directions to appear at his father's church in Pleasantville, New Jersey. Despite telling her that it was a long drive from Mendham, Houston showed up and then gave a performance of "God Will Take Care of You". Jerkins claimed the pair engaged in meditation and prayer.

Eventually, Houston entered the Crossway studio to record her vocals on the song. Much like she had done with her songs, Houston was the vocal arranger. Jerkins stated that upon first recording Houston that she "took [him] to church inside the studio. She's giving you full-throttle effort at all times", adding that the artist "[did] it the same extraordinary way every time". Jerkins called Houston a "genius".

Jerkins claimed later that the song "jumpstarted" production on what became the My Love Is Your Love album. Jerkins would create a quiet storm ballad rendition of "It's Not Right but It's Okay", labeling it the "RJ Smooth Mix".

=== Thunderpuss version ===
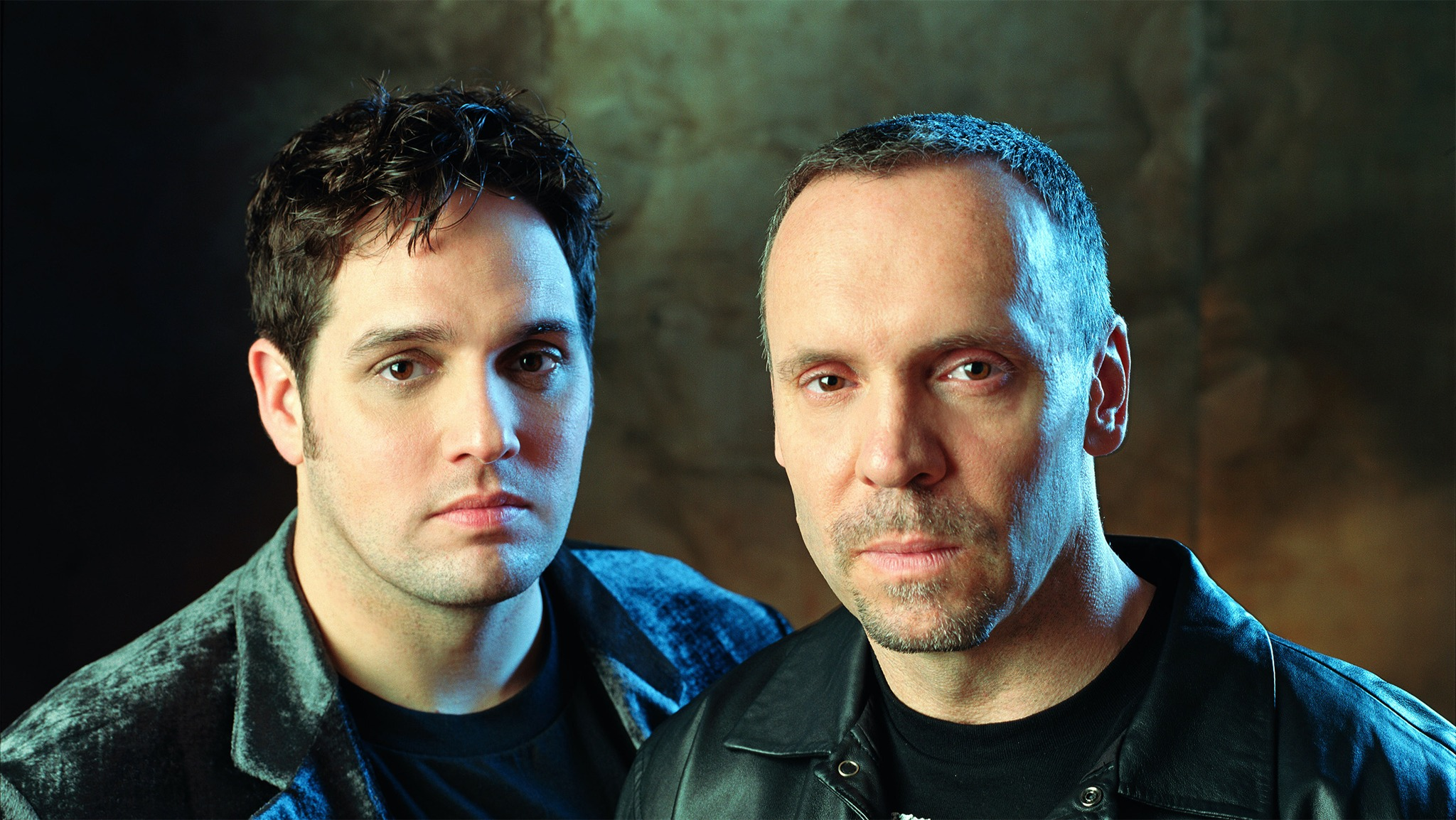
Thunderpuss (pictured in 2002) were the main remixers of "It's Not Right but It's Okay".

Chris Cox and Barry Harris of the house remix/production team Thunderpuss had recently released a successful remix of Billie Myers' "Kiss the Rain" when they were approached by Arista vice president of A&R Hosh Gureli at the gay nightclub Splash in Manhattan of the choice of remixing either "If I Told You That" or "It's Not Right but It's Okay" for Houston in November 1998, just as the My Love Is Your Love album was released.

Cox told Fader in 2017 that the duo decided on the latter song because it was "the easiest way... to go with" and because "[the original version] is quite chilled out — not quite 2-step — but R&Bish. Her voice seemed to have more assertiveness that would appeal more to a dance record."

When asked if they felt any pressure on producing what they called Houston's "comeback record", Cox denied it saying "[the] pressure was always internal. I had worked with big artists before but Arista was the dance label, and here’s one of the most important voices in pop history. So we were thinking, It’s Whitney. We can't [mess] this up."

Calling the Jerkins version "laid back and sleepy", Cox and Harris took more of Houston's adlibs from near the end of the record and pushed it to the forefront, while throwing away the rest of the song, only keeping Houston's lead vocal and background vocals. Eventually two versions—a radio version and an extended nine-minute club version—was created.

Barry & Chris created brand new instrumentation by recomposing & replaying new keyboards, drums and reinvented the music from the ground up.

=== Composition ===
"It's Not Right but It's Okay" is a R&B and neo soul song. According to the sheet music published at Universal Music Publishing, the song mainly plays in the keys of F_{m} and C_{m} and has a moderately fast funk tempo with a time signature of 4/4 common time with 126 beats per minute. Houston's vocals span from G_{3} to A♭_{5} in the song. The Thunderpuss version is set at a dance tempo of 132 beats per minute, starting at the key of C_{m}.

== Release ==
The song was initially released as the b-side to "Heartbreak Hotel", on December 15, 1998. Remixes of the song by Johnny Vicious were included on the domestic CD maxi-single. The KCC remix was included on the US version of the "My Love Is Your Love" maxi-single, released in May 1999. The song was released as a commercial retail single that same month and featured the Thunderpuss remixes as well as remixes by Club 69 and Rodney Jerkins.

The song had already entered the US dance and R&B charts when it was officially released in Europe in February 1999 as the official third single from the album. The original Jerkins single was played on the radio but by spring, mainstream spins and retail sales were given to the Thunderpuss mix, which many claimed was responsible for its US pop chart success.

The Thunderpuss version was placed on Houston's first compilation album, Whitney: The Greatest Hits (2000). The original album version was included in The Ultimate Collection (2007) as well as the second international disc of I Will Always Love You: The Best of Whitney Houston (2012).

== Critical reception ==
The song received generally positive reviews from music critics, who praised Houston's vocal performance, its contemporary R&B production, and its appeal as a dance track. Bill Lamb of About.com described the song as a "hard-hitting anthem for women on the way out of relationships," praising its appeal both on radio and on the dance floor. J. D. Considine of The Baltimore Sun praised the song's portrayal of a woman confronting an abusive and unfaithful partner, while cautioning against interpreting its lyrics as a direct reference to contemporary reports concerning Houston's then-husband, Bobby Brown. Jon Pareles of the New York Times highlighted Jerkins' production, particularly its tense keyboard arrangement and electronic rhythm. He also praised Houston's increasingly forceful and syncopated vocal delivery, which gave the song a more assertive character than her traditional ballads. Chuck Taylor of Billboard similarly praised the song's contemporary sound, highlighting Jerkins's "jittery funk beat" and Houston's forceful performance. He described the single as "appealing and refreshing," while noting that Jerkins's Smooth remix provided a softer alternative for listeners more accustomed to Houston's ballads.

Andy Gill of The Independent regarded the song as a notable departure from Houston's established style, describing its "light, frisky kalimba-funk groove" and her "assertive mode" as she confronts a cheating partner. He characterized the track as "angry and urgent" and suggested that its rhythmic construction made it particularly suited to remixing. Gerald Martinez of the New Straits Times likewise singled out the track as "infectious," noting its immediate impact as the opening song on My Love Is Your Love. The Birmingham Evening Mail gave the song a mixed assessment, praising Houston's performance of it at the Brit Awards and acknowledging its contemporary R&B sound, while characterizing the song itself as commercially effective but relatively unremarkable. Daily Record characterized Houston's performance as "streetwise" and identified the song as her biggest single since "I Will Always Love You." The Thunderpuss remix subsequently received recognition for its impact on dance music culture. Writing for BuzzFeed, Matt Stopera and Brian Galindo described the remix as a landmark of the 1990s gay dance-floor scene and argued that it transformed the song into an iconic dance track.

== Chart performance ==
=== North America ===
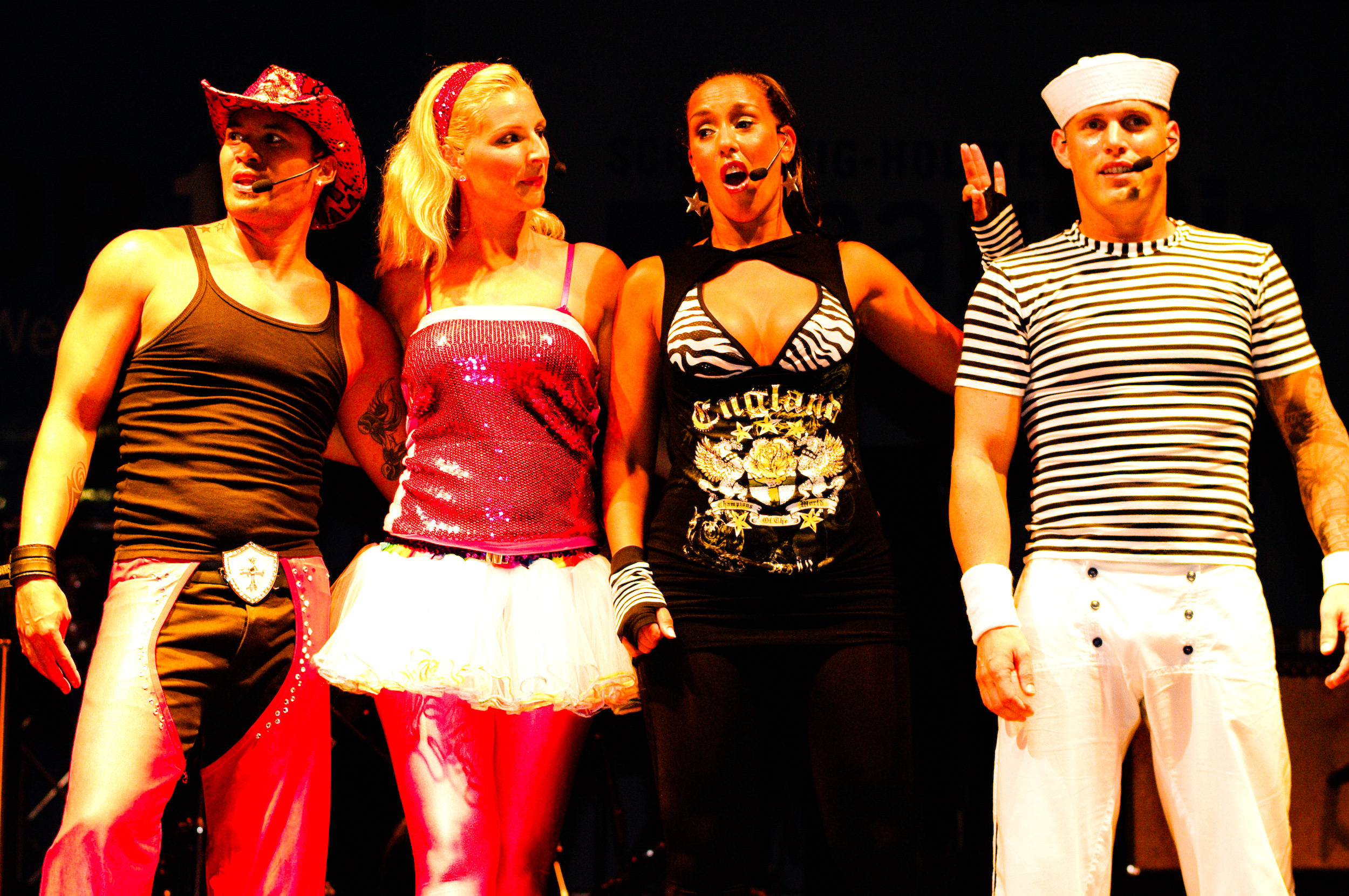
"It's Not Right but It's Okay" replaced the Vengaboys song "Up and Down" at number one on the Billboard Dance Club Play chart in 1999.

In the United States, the song first entered the Billboard Dance Club Play chart with its Thunderpuss version at number 30 on December 26, 1998, becoming the "Hot Shot Debut" of the week.

Five weeks later, on January 23, 1999, the song peaked at the top of the chart, replacing the Vengaboys' "Up and Down" from the top spot, starting a three-week run, becoming her longest-running number-one dance single, sharing it with "I Learned From the Best". It was Houston's sixth number-one single on the dance chart and her first since "Queen of the Night" in January 1994.

On the January 2, 1999, issue of Billboard, the song entered the Hot R&B Singles & Tracks chart at number 65, simultaneously joining her other singles "Heartbreak Hotel" and "When You Believe" on the chart.

On July 3, in the song's 19th week on the chart, it reached its peak of number seven, becoming Houston's career 25th top-10 single. It would eventually spend a total of 30 cumulative weeks on the chart, becoming her longest charting single on the chart, staying on the chart for over six months, later shared with "Million Dollar Bill" over a decade later.

On the May 8, 1999, issue of Billboard, the song entered the Billboard Hot 100 at number 87, becoming Houston's 30th career entry on the chart. On its fifth week on the charts, the song entered the top 40 at number 32 for the week of June 6, becoming Houston's 27th top-40 entry. On July 3, it reached its peak of number four, becoming Houston's 21st career top-10 single on the chart. It would eventually spend five weeks inside the top ten and spend 20 cumulative weeks on the chart altogether.

Outside the United States, the song reached number three on the Canadian Singles Chart, giving Houston her 19th career top 10 and her first in nearly four years to reach the top ten. In the same issue, Houston became the first artist to send the same song to the top 10 as an imported version of the single debuted at number eight. On the August 21 issue, the imported version peaked at number five on the chart, marking another historic feat for Houston as the first artist to place two versions of the same song in the top five in Canada.

=== Europe ===
In Europe, the song also became a sizable hit, especially in the United Kingdom, where it would debut and peak at number three on the OCC UK singles chart for the week of March 6, 1999, becoming Houston's 13th top-10 single in the region. It would eventually spend its initial chart run at 15 cumulative weeks from March to June 1999. In July 1999, it returned to the top 100 for two more weeks. Following Houston's passing, the song reentered the UK charts at number 61, becoming one of 12 simultaneous top 75 UK singles Houston achieved, which set an unbroken UK chart record for a woman for most simultaneous top 75 entries in a single week, earning a Guinness World Record. On the OCC R&B singles chart, it debuted at number one, where it would stay for four consecutive weeks. It was her first chart-topper on that chart. It would spend 20 cumulative weeks there.

The song also reached number three in both Iceland and Poland. In Spain, it became Houston's fourth number-one single in the region after "I Wanna Dance with Somebody (Who Loves Me)", "I Will Always Love You" and "Exhale (Shoop Shoop)". Elsewhere in Europe, the song placed in the top ten in Scotland, Italy and the Netherlands Dutch Top 40. It had top 20 placements in Germany, Austria, the Netherlands Single Top 100, Sweden and Switzerland while peaking in the top 40 in Belgium, France and Ireland. The song's overall European chart success helped the song peak at number nine on the Eurochart Hot 100.

=== Oceania ===
The song had a more moderate reception in Oceania. In Australia, it peaked at number 88, while in New Zealand, as a double A-side with "Heartbreak Hotel", it peaked at number 33.

== Music video ==
The music video was directed by Kevin Bray and became iconic for Houston showcasing an edgier look than in previous music videos, wearing a strapless leather gown styled by fashion designer Gianfranco Ferré, a sleek bob, a single fingerless glove, choker necklace and dark makeup.

Houston is shown in the beginning sitting down around a glass dining table addressing her cheating lover directly behind a black background that sparks up. Houston is then joined by several women singing the chorus. Houston's backing dancers are also shown in various shots of the video.

Much like many of the videos from the singles off the My Love Is Your Love album, the video instantly earned heavy rotation on MTV and BET and was played constantly on MTV's countdown channel, Total Request Live. Later, the remix version of the video aired on the same channel while the original was played on BET.

On Houston's official YouTube channel, the official music video has been viewed 143 million times on the channel.

== Live performances ==
Houston gave live performances of the song on several television shows in both Europe and the United States. In Europe, Houston performed the song on the Netherlands TV show The Surprise Show, the Italian TV show C'era Un Ragazzo, the Spanish TV show Sorpresa Sorpresa, the German TV show Wetten, dass... and the 1999 Brit Awards and Top of the Pops in the UK. The February 16, 1999, BRIT Awards performance in particular was hailed as "iconic".

In the United States, she performed the song live at the 13th Annual Soul Train Music Awards in March 1999, VH1's Divas Live '99 the following April, and The Oprah Winfrey Show in June. On June 28, 1999, Houston performed the Thunderpuss club remix version of the song along with the Hex Hector remix of "Heartbreak Hotel" during an unannounced, surprise performance at the 13th Annual New York Lesbian & Gay Pride Dance at Manhattan's West Side Piers in front of a crowd of over 7,000 fans.

According to Instinct magazine, Houston's unannounced performance at the Piers "ushered in a new era that would eventually make high-profile artists performing at LGBTQ events virtually commonplace". The performance was recorded by MTV and first aired on an All Access documentary special dedicated to Houston launching her My Love Is Your Love World Tour. In June 2022, Houston's estate uploaded the full live performance of the song on her official YouTube channel.

Houston also performed the song, along with the just-released single, "I Learned From the Best", at the 42nd Annual Grammy Awards on February 23, 2000. It would be her eighth and final Grammy performance. With this achievement, Houston tied with Aretha Franklin for the second most Grammy performances ever by a female artist in the show's history. Houston performed the song on her two final world tours, the My Love Is Your Love World Tour (1999) and the Nothing but Love World Tour (2009–2010).

During her 2009 performance at Clive Davis' pre-Grammy party, Houston performed a riveting rendition of the song that won her praise from critics who viewed the show, which was notable as the singer's comeback performance after personal struggles.

== Legacy and influence ==
=== Impact ===
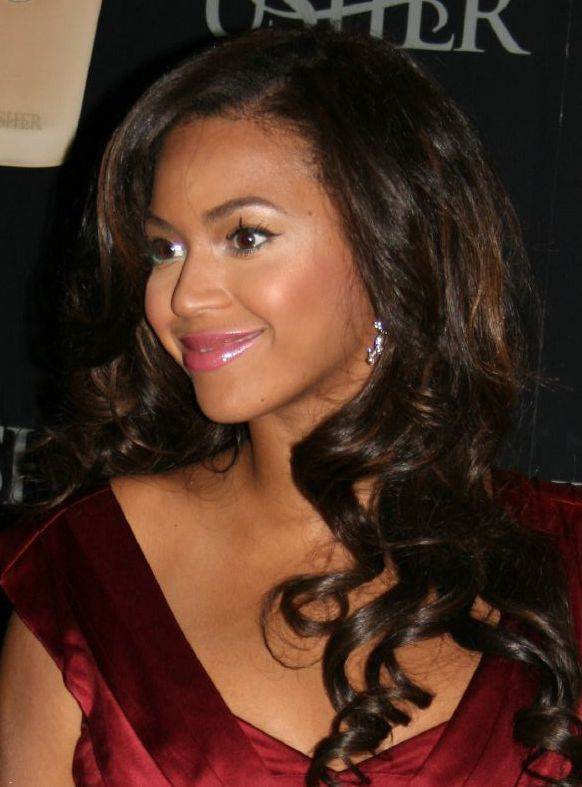
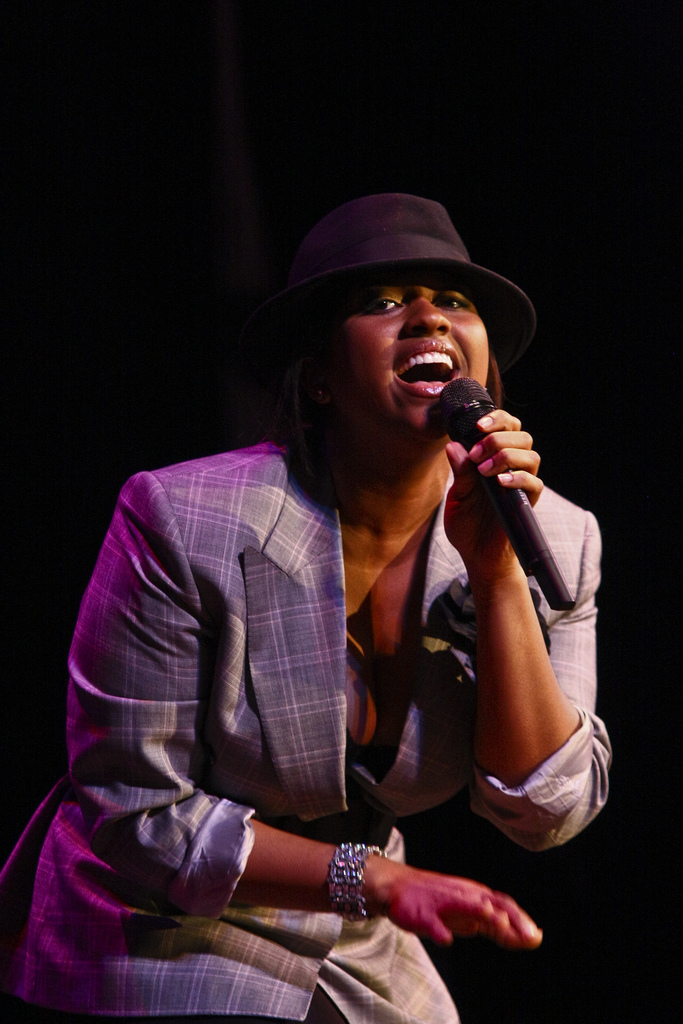
“It’s Not Right but It’s Okay” inspired later hits such as “Irreplaceable” by Beyoncé (left) and “Bust Your Windows” by Jazmine Sullivan (right).

According to Songfacts, the song "brought Houston into the modern era of hip-hop with contemporary production and a lyric that oozes empowerment," noting that artists like Aaliyah and Mary J. Blige had songs of a similar sound and with the release of "It's Not Right...", Houston "showed that she could tap into it as well."

According to the site Industryme, later female R&B songs such as "Irreplaceable" by Beyoncé and "Bust Your Windows" by Jazmine Sullivan took direct influence from "It's Not Right but It's Okay". Jennifer Lopez was advised to change the sound of her hit "Feelin' So Good" because it "sounded similar" to "It's Not Right but It's Okay" but Lopez refused to do so.

In its article about the Thunderpuss remix, Fader magazine credited the original R&B rendition of the song for inspiring the later productions of Destiny's Child songs. Billboard stated the song "redefined" R&B music in their 2025 write-up on the song.

=== Accolades and achievements ===
At the 42nd Annual Grammy Awards in 2000, Houston won her sixth and final competitive Grammy for the song, her first in the Best Female R&B Vocal Performance category. The win made her the first winner of the award in the new millennium and one of the few artists to win Grammys in three different decades. Houston had been nominated six times for the award in the past. In winning the Grammy, she became only the third woman in history to win Grammys in the R&B and pop categories, preceded by Dionne Warwick (1980) and Toni Braxton (1997). The song also won the Best Pop Dance 12" Record at the International Dance Music Awards in 2000.

The song made the Billboard year-end lists in 1999, ranking as the 44th best performing song of the year on the Billboard Hot 100 list, the 37th best performing song of the year on the Hot R&B Singles list and the 11th best performing song of the year on the Hot Dance Club Play list. In the UK, it was the 25th best-selling song of the year. It also made the year-end lists in Spain, the Netherlands, Sweden, Romania and Germany.

In June 1999, before its peak on the Hot 100, the song was certified gold by the RIAA for sales of half a million copies. Nearly 20 years later, in March 2019, it was re-certified platinum for sales of over a million copies. On March 19, 1999, the song was certified silver and gold on the same day in the United Kingdom by the BPI. In April 2017, it was re-certified platinum for sales of 600,000 copies. On what would've been Houston's 61st birthday on August 9, 2024, the song was certified 2x platinum for sales of over 1.2 million copies, becoming her fourth multi-platinum single there. In February 2024, it was certified gold in New Zealand for sales of over 15,000 copies.

=== Cover versions and samples ===
The song was covered by Darren Criss on the hit Fox TV show Glee. Criss' character, Blaine, was confronting his own 'cheating' lover in the Whitney Houston tribute special, "Dance with Somebody".

It was also covered on the "Lies" single and The Mother We Share EP by Chvrches as well as British soul singer Craig David. The song was heavily sampled in Mak & Pasteman's "It Ain't Right" and Shane Codd's "Rather Be Alone".

According to the sample database site, WhoSampled, the song was covered 28 times and sampled 59 times.

=== Usage in popular media ===
In the Glee tribute episode to Houston, "Dance with Somebody", where Darren Criss performs the song, along with some of his fellow castmates, they reenact the dark background with the sparkling lights, shown in the original music video, while Criss wears an all-black outfit and sits in a glass dinner table similarly to Houston. The music video was also re-enacted in the official Houston biopic, Whitney Houston: I Wanna Dance with Somebody, by actress Naomi Ackie.

In season nine of RuPaul's Drag Race, the song was performed during the lip-sync competition finale between Sasha Velour and Peppermint, with Velour beating Peppermint at the end, leading her to win the season overall. This also marked the first time that a recording artist's music was performed twice in the show's lip-sync competition, with "So Emotional" having been performed earlier in the same episode, also featuring Velour and another contestant Shea Couleé. The performance resulted in the original song's Spotify streams to increase by 190%, while another Houston hit performed earlier in the series, "So Emotional" saw a 650% spike on the same platform.

=== Polls and rankings ===
Since its release, the song has been regarded as one of the greatest songs of all time and has made several best-of lists in various magazines and media outlets.

In 2003, Q Magazine ranked the song at number 638 in their list of the "1001 Best Songs Ever".

In 2012, E! News ranked it as one of the top five Whitney Houston songs, writing that it "has been acknowledged as the ultimate breakup tune".

In 2017, the song was ranked the sixth greatest dance song of the 1990s by BuzzFeed.

About.com ranked it as the 15th best Houston song ever out of 20. On the site's "Best 100 Songs from the 1990s" list, the song was voted the 28th best.

In 2019, Billboard listed it as one of the Greatest Songs of 1999. That same year, L.A. Weekly ranked the song the ninth best gay anthem of the 1980s-1990s era, tying with Houston's 1987 anthem "I Wanna Dance with Somebody (Who Loves Me)", and compared the song to Cher's "Believe" and Gloria Gaynor's "I Will Survive".

In 2020, the same year of Houston's Rock and Roll Hall of Fame induction, Billboard ranked the song as Houston's third best song ever.

In 2022, the Thunderpuss club mix of the song was included in the list of the 200 greatest dance songs of all time on Rolling Stone.

That same year, on what would've been Houston's 59th birthday in 2022, BET ranked the song 11th place among 40 of Houston's best songs ever. The Guardian ranked it Houston's fifth greatest song, writing that though the house remix outperformed it in popularity that the original Jerkins version was "the one you want: its cool tone fits the subject matter perfectly."

In their list of 20 of what they considered Houston's greatest songs ever, Forbes ranked the song 7th place, writing that the song was "Houston's foremost anthem that looks at the importance of independence and strength after betrayal and soured love."

In 2025, Billboard listed the song in its 100 Best Dance Songs of All Time list at number 72. That same year, the song was ranked number 45 of the Greatest LGBTQ Anthems of All Time.

Phillip Henry of Billboard wrote in 2018 how the song was the "gay national anthem". Owen Myers of The Fader called it Houston's "most iconic gay anthem".

In its 2025 write-up on the song, Billboard stated, "With a message of empowerment and perseverance, Whitney Houston continues the legacy of Gloria Gaynor" with the song, comparing it to Gaynor's similar anthem, "I Will Survive" (1978) and stated that the Thunderpuss remix "reintroduc[ed] America's greatest singer as a club queen."

== Track listings ==
- UK CD1
1. "It's Not Right but It's Okay" (Original Radio Mix) – 4:15
2. "It's Not Right but It's Okay" (Club 69 Club Mix) – 7:58
3. "It's Not Right but It's Okay" (Johnny Vicious Radio Mix) – 4:14
- UK CD2
1. "It's Not Right but It's Okay" (Original Radio Mix) – 4:15
2. "Step by Step" – 4:12
3. "I'm Every Woman" – 4:47
- European maxi-single (The Dance Mixes)
1. "It's Not Right but It's Okay" (Original Radio Mix) – 4:15
2. "It's Not Right but It's Okay" (Club 69 Radio Mix) – 4:18
3. "It's Not Right but It's Okay" (Johnny Vicious Radio Mix) – 4:25
4. "It's Not Right but It's Okay" (Thunderpuss 2000 Club Mix) – 9:14
- 12-inch vinyl

A1. "It's Not Right but It's Okay" (KCC's Release The Love Groove Mix) – 7:05
B1. "It's Not Right but It's Okay" (Club 69 Future Mix) – 8:02
B2. "It's Not Right but It's Okay" (Rodney Jerkins Smooth Mix) – 4:26

- 12-inch vinyl (Thunderpuss 2000 Remixes)

A1. "It's Not Right but It's Okay" (Club Mix) – 9:15
A2. "It's Not Right but It's Okay" (Radio Mix) – 4:16
B1. "It's Not Right but It's Okay" (Thunderpuss Dub) – 8:19
B2. "It's Not Right but It's Okay" (Thunderpuss Beats) – 4:22

- US CD single
1. "It's Not Right but It's Okay" (Original Radio Mix) – 4:15
2. "It's Not Right but It's Okay" (Rodney Jerkins Smooth Mix) – 4:15
3. "It's Not Right but It's Okay" (Thunderpuss Mix) – 4:11
- US maxi-CD single
1. "It's Not Right but It's Okay" (Rodney Jerkins Smooth Mix) – 4:30
2. "It's Not Right but It's Okay" (Rodney Jerkins Smooth Instrumental) – 4:30
3. "It's Not Right but It's Okay" (Thunderpuss Radio Mix) – 4:18
4. "It's Not Right but It's Okay" (Club 69 Radio Mix) – 4:21
5. "It's Not Right but It's Okay" (Thunderpuss Club Mix) – 9:12
6. "It's Not Right but It's Okay" (Club 69 Future Club Mix) – 8:05
7. "It's Not Right but It's Okay" (Club 69 Future Dub) – 7:52
8. "I Will Always Love You" (Hex Hector Club Mix) – 9:50 (Special bonus cut)
- 12-inch vinyl (Johnny Vicious Remixes)

A1. "It's Not Right but It's Okay" (Johnny Vicious Momentous Mix) – 13:03
B1. "It's Not Right but It's Okay" (Johnny Vicious Momentous Dub) – 8:31
B2. "It's Not Right but It's Okay" (Radio Mix) – 4:11

== Charts ==
=== Weekly charts ===
Original version

Weekly chart performance for original version
Chart (1999–2000)	Peak position
Australia (ARIA)	88
Austria (Ö3 Austria Top 40)	20
Belgium (Ultratop 50 Flanders)	40
Canada (Nielsen SoundScan)	3
Canada CHR (Nielsen BDS)	17
Europe (Eurochart Hot 100)	9
France (SNEP)	21
French Airplay (SNEP)	1
Germany (GfK)	14
Iceland (Íslenski Listinn Topp 40)	3
Ireland (IRMA)	21
Italy (FIMI)	9
Netherlands (Dutch Top 40)	10
Netherlands (Single Top 100)	12
New Zealand (Recorded Music NZ) with "Heartbreak Hotel"	33
Poland Airplay (Music & Media)	3
Quebec (ADISQ)	15
Scottish Singles Sales (Official Charts)	8
Spain (Promusicae)	1
Sweden (Sverigetopplistan)	12
Switzerland (Schweizer Hitparade)	18
UK Singles (Official Charts)	3
UK Hip Hop/R&B (Official Charts)	1
UK Airplay (Music Week)	8
US Billboard Hot 100	4
US Dance Club Songs (Billboard)	1
US Dance Singles Sales (Billboard)	2
US Hot R&B/Hip-Hop Songs (Billboard)	7
US Pop Airplay (Billboard)	23
US Rhythmic Airplay (Billboard)	15

Chart (2012)	Peak position
UK Singles (Official Charts)	61

Felix Jaehn Remix

Weekly chart performance for Felix Jaehn remix
Chart (2025)	Peak position
Croatia International Airplay (Top lista)	44
Czech Republic Airplay (ČNS IFPI)	1
Estonia Airplay (TopHit)	19
Israel International Airplay (Media Forest)	11

=== Year-end charts ===
Annual chart rankings for original version
Chart (1999)	Position
Germany (Media Control)	83
Netherlands (Dutch Top 40)	90
Netherlands (Single Top 100)	85
Romania (Romanian Top 100)	34
Spain (AFYVE)	17
Sweden (Hitlistan)	83
UK Singles (OCC)	25
UK Airplay (Music Week)	23
US Billboard Hot 100	44
US Dance Club Play (Billboard)	11
US Hot R&B/Hip-Hop Singles & Tracks (Billboard)	37
US Mainstream Top 40 (Billboard)	61
US Maxi-Singles Sales (Billboard)	11
US Rhythmic Top 40 (Billboard)	56

Felix Jaehn Remix

=== Monthly charts ===
Monthly chart performance for "It's Not Right but It's Okay"
Chart (2025)	Position
Estonia Airplay (TopHit)	30

=== Year-end charts ===
2025 year-end chart performance for "It's Not Right but It's Okay"
Chart (2025)	Position
Estonia Airplay (TopHit)	73

== Certifications ==
Certifications and sales
Region	Certification	Certified units/sales
New Zealand (RMNZ)	Gold	15,000^{‡}
United Kingdom (BPI)	2× Platinum	1,200,000^{‡}
United States (RIAA)	Platinum	1,000,000^{‡}
^{‡} Sales+streaming figures based on certification alone.

== Release history ==
Street dates
Region	Version	Date	Format(s)	Label(s)	Ref(s).
Sweden	"It's Not Right but It's Okay"	February 15, 1999	CD	Arista; BMG	
United Kingdom	"It's Not Right but It's Okay"	February 22, 1999	CD; cassette	Arista; BMG	
Japan	"Heartbreak Hotel" / "It's Not Right but It's Okay"	February 24, 1999	CD	Arista	
United States	"It's Not Right but It's Okay"	April 19, 1999	Rhythmic contemporary radio; urban contemporary radio	Arista	
United States	"It's Not Right but It's Okay"	May 25, 1999	12-inch vinyl; CD; cassette	Arista	

== Mr. Belt & Wezol version ==
"It's Not Right (But It's Okay)"

Single by Mr. Belt & Wezol
- Released: February 23, 2024
- Genre: House
- Length: 2:32; 4:01 (extended version)
- Label: Sony
- Producers: Mr. Belt & Wezol

Mr. Belt & Wezol singles chronology
"Waiting for You" (2023)	"It's Not Right (But It's Okay)" (2024)	"Don’t Stop Lovin" (2025)

Music video
- "It's Not Right (But It's Okay)" on YouTube

In 2024, Dutch electronic music duo Mr. Belt & Wezol released a remixed version of the song as a single. It became their most successful song, reaching number 7 in their home country, top 20 in Belgium, and charting in France, Germany and Switzerland.

=== Charts ===
==== Weekly charts ====
Weekly chart performance for Mr. Belt & Wezol version
Chart (2024)	Peak position
Belgium (Ultratop 50 Flanders)	11
Belgium (Ultratop 50 Wallonia)	22
France (SNEP)	45
Germany (GfK)	89
Netherlands (Dutch Top 40)	9
Netherlands (Single Top 100)	7
Switzerland (Schweizer Hitparade)	71

== See also ==
- Grammy Award for Best Female R&B Vocal Performance
- List of number-one singles of 1999 (Spain)
- List of number-one dance singles of 1999 (U.S.)
- List of number-one songs of the 2020s (Czech Republic)
