= If Ever (3rd Storee song) =

Single by 3rd Storee

from the album The 3rd Storee
- B-side: "If They Only Knew"
- Released: March 2, 1999
- Recorded: 1998
- Genre: R&B
- Length: 4:14 (album version); 3:39 (radio edit)
- Label: Yab Yum; EastWest; Elektra
- Songwriter(s): Babyface

3rd Storee singles chronology
"If Ever" (1999)	"Party Tonight" (1999)

"If Ever" is a song performed by 3rd Storee, issued as the first single from their eponymous debut album. The song peaked at #64 on the Billboard R&B chart in 1999.

== Music video ==
The official music video for the song was directed by Mark Gerard.

== Charts ==
Chart performance for "If Ever"
Chart (1999)	Peak position
US Hot R&B/Hip-Hop Singles & Tracks (Billboard)	64
US Rhythmic Top 40 (Billboard)	36
