= Nicholas Longano =

Australian video game industry executive

Nicholas F. Longano
- Born: 28 May 1965 (age 61); Melbourne, Australia
- Occupation: Businessman
- Spouse: Pauline Elena Aguilera (m. 1998)

Nicholas Longano (born 28 May 1965 in Melbourne, Australia) is a video game industry executive.

== Early career ==
Prior to the video game industry, Longano worked in the beauty and beverage industries. In the late 1980s he worked as a product manager in his home city of Melbourne, Australia, and was involved with the Pepsi, Sunkist and Evian brands. There followed some time spent working at L'Oreal and Revlon in New York, then at Calvin Klein cosmetics.

== Video game career ==
In January 2001, Longano became Executive Vice President of Marketing and Publishing at Vivendi Universal Games. Longano ran the publishing for the company's core video game titles and online multiplayer games. In May 2002 Longano became General Manager of Universal Studios video game division, in charge of production and publishing for tent-pole theatrical-based games.

In 2005, Longano was President of New Media at in-game advertising company Massive Incorporated. In May 2006, Massive was acquired by Microsoft for reportedly several hundred million. Longano left Microsoft and Massive later that year.

One year later, Longano formed game publishing company Brash Entertainment, with three partners: Mitch Davis, Thomas Tull and Bert Ellis. Brash Entertainment developed film-based intellectual property. Longano served as president and COO. Over the course of 16 months, Brash Entertainment raised US$150 million in funding and licensed over 25 film properties. Longano left Brash in May 2008.

== Online ventures ==
In May 2008, along with Rodney Jerkins and Ray Brown, Longano formed MusicMogul.com, and became the CEO of the company. MusicMogul.com was an online marketing platform for aspiring artists, allowing them to communicate directly with their fans. Every quarter, members voted for the best video performances. The top performers were flown to Los Angeles to compete in front of a panel of celebrity judges. Winners received a demo deal with Jerkins' Dark Child Productions.

Longano also started Over the Top Networks, creating digital content for celebrities. Examples include the Paula Deen's Recipe Quest video game on iOS and Android.

== Personal life ==
Longano married Pauline Elena Aguilera (the great-great-granddaughter of Philip Lehman, of Lehman Brothers) on 9 May 1998.
