= Rhona Bennett =

American singer and actress

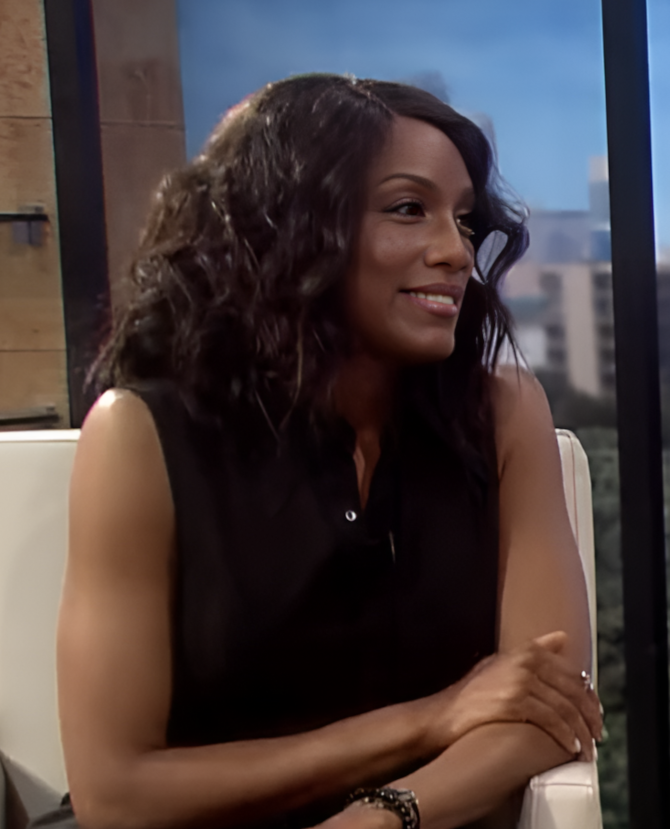
- Bennett in 2018.

Background information
- Also known as: Miss R&B; Coach Rho
- Born: Rhona Lynn Bennett; May 10, 1976 (age 50); Chicago, Illinois, U.S.
- Genres: R&B; pop
- Occupations: Singer; songwriter; actress; speaker; author; life coach
- Instrument: Vocals
- Years active: 1991–present
- Formerly of: En Vogue
- Website: rhonabennett.com

Rhona Lynn Bennett-Simon (born May 10, 1976) is an American singer, songwriter, actress, author, and life coach. She came to prominence as a cast member of the Disney Channel's variety show The All New Mickey Mouse Club in which she appeared for four seasons. After the show ended, Bennett ventured into acting and was a guest actor on several television series, before becoming a regular on the UPN sitcom Homeboys in Outer Space (1996-1997) and in the fourth season of The WB's The Jamie Foxx Show.

In 2000, she launched a music career and was signed with Sony Music through producer Rodney Jerkins' label. While the album first single, "Satisfied," became a top five hit on the US Hot Dance Club Play chart, her self-titled debut album received a limited Japan-wide release only. In 2003, she became a performing member of the R&B group En Vogue, with whom she has intermittently toured and released music ever since, including their latest albums Soul Flower (2004) and Electric Café (2018). Concurrent with her projects with En Vogue, Bennett released her second solo album Instant Classic in 2024.

Beginning in the 2010s, Bennett expanded her career to include work as an author. speaker and life coach, alongside her ongoing activities as an actress and singer. In 2012, she published the mini-book Got Motivation? How to Stay Motivated. Since then, she has written several other mini-books on topics such as nutrition, motivation, and coping with everyday challenges and illness. In 2016, Bennett also launched her online coaching school Personal Power University.

== Early life ==
Bennett, the younger sister of former Chicago Force right guard Roz Bennett, was raised in Calumet Park, Chicago. She began her musical journey as a child, singing in church choirs in her hometown of Chicago — most notably with the renowned Soul Children. At age 11, she became background singer at the ETA Creative Arts Theater, where she performed her first major part in a stage production of A Christmas Carol. Simultaneously, she pursued her education at Polaris High School in Oak Lawn.

== Career ==
=== 1991–1999: The All New Mickey Mouse Club and television roles ===
In 1990, Bennett auditioned to became a Mouseketeer on Disney Channel's revival of The Mickey Mouse Club, a variety show presented by 19 dancing and singing teenagers, who act in skits, appear in videos, and interview celebrities. Following a successful casting, she joined the Mouseketeer roster during the show's fourth season in 1991, with the ensemble at the time featuring several emerging talents, including Britney Spears, Christina Aguilera, Justin Timberlake and JC Chasez. In 1994, The All New Mickey Mouse Club was cancelled after seven seasons.

Encouraged by friends, she decided to try her luck in California as an actress. Television became her milieu and she was soon appearing in guest or supporting roles in sitcoms such as Living Single, The Single Guy, and Martin. In 1996, Bennett also garnered a regular role on the short-lived UPN science fiction sitcom Homeboys in Outer Space, also starring Flex Alexander and Darryl M. Bell. In 1999, she was cast in Marius Balchunas debut film No Vacancy (1999), an independent comedy that also starred Christina Ricci. The same year, casting director Dee Dee Bradley asked Bennett to join the fourth season of the WB sitcom The Jamie Foxx Show, on which she played Nicole, Jamie's co-worker and singing partner.

=== 2000–2008: Rhona and En Vogue ===
In late 2000, Bennett signed with Sony Music under producer Rodney "Darkchild" Jerkins' newfly founded boutique imprint Darkchild Records, where she was given the title "First Lady of Darkchild." Jerkins recruited most of his regular collaborators to work alongside Bennett and him on her self-titled debut album, including Robert "Big Bert" Smith, LaShawn Daniels, and his brother Fred Jerkins III. The album's first single, "Satisfied," released in March 2001, became a top five hit on the US Hot Dance Club Play chart the following month, but failed to chart or sell noticeably elsewhere. Following a promotional world trip, further plans to release Rhona were put on hold after a fallout between Sony Music and Darkchild Records. Consequently, the album received a limited Japan-wide release only and Bennett was soon dropped from the label.

In 2002, Bennett landed a leading role opposite Allen Payne in the stage play Men Cry in the Dark (2003), based on the same-titled 1999 novel by Michael Baisden. The following year, Bennett was asked to join R&B girl group En Vogue as a performing member after being recommended to the band's mentor Denzel Foster through a mutual friend and songwriting partner, replacing Amanda Cole. During her five-year tenure with the band, Bennett released the album Soul Flower (2004) along with original band members Terry Ellis and Cindy Herron. In 2008, following several years of touring, Bennett left the band amid their 20th Anniversary World Tour due to the return of original member Dawn Robinson.

=== 2009–present: Solo projects and return to En Vogue ===
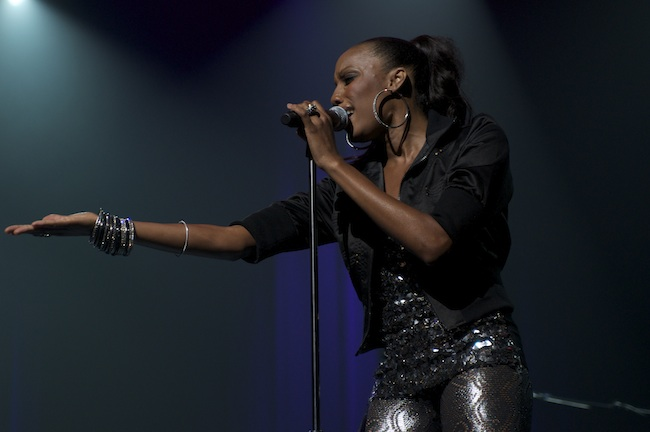
Bennett performing live on stage in 2009.

Following her departure from En Vogue, Bennett began work on her second solo album, The Anticipation of R&B, under her own label, Tone'n'Rhone Productions. She worked with a variety of musicians on the project, including producers J.Y. Park, Cool Ruckus, Peter Zora, and J.U.S.T.I.C.E. League, as well as guest vocalists such as Brandy, 40 Glocc and her former En Vogue colleagues Ellis and Herron. Preceded by the singles "Range" and "Letting You Go," the album was shelved in 2010 due to internal conflicts and insufficient promotion, with a third single, "Don't Call Me" also eventually being cancelled. Bennett later released several songs from The Anticipation of R&B on her SoundCloud account.

In 2010, Bennett launched her Personal Power coaching business under her alias Coach Rho. In 2012, she began authoring mini-books, starting with Got Motivation? How To Stay Motivated and followed by Find and Pursue Your Passion... Even with a Regular Job (2012) Eating Healthier for Less (2013), Beyond a Wish – How to Discover the Champion Within (2014), and Beyond the Fear: Real Stories of Inspiration while facing Illness and Adversity (2015). The same year, Bennett rejoined En Vogue after new material by all four original members had failed to materialize again and both Robinson and Jones once more had left the band. In July 2014, Bennett, Ellis, and Herron began work on En Vogue's seventh album Electric Café. In November, the trio appeared in the Lifetime holiday film An En Vogue Christmas, in which they played fictional versions of themselves.

In 2016, Bennett launched her online coaching school Personal Power University and released the solo single "Take Me There" through her own label Butterfly In Flight, which was expected to precede a solo EP entitled R&B Gumbo. As with The Anticipation of R&B, this EP ultimately failed to materialze, despite the recordings being completed. Following the release of Electric Café, her second studio album with En Vogue and first in a decade, as well as intense touring and promotional activities with the band, Bennett wrote and released the book Saving Your Soul, a self-help guide to help musicians through the entertainment industry, in August 2022. She also released her second studio album Instant Classic through Butterfly In Flight in November 2024. Involving chief production and songwriting from David Kater, three singles were released from the album, including "We (A Powerful Thing)", "Butterfly", and "All on You". On November 13, 2025, Bennett announced her departure from the group after being left out the Rock and Roll Hall of Fame performance with Salt-N-Pepa.

== Personal life ==
After meeting and becoming friends as freshmen in high school, Bennett and Shantiel Simon began dating in April 2021. On September 9, 2022, they married in a private ceremony.

== Discography ==
=== Studio albums ===
Title	Album details	Peak chart positions
Title	Album details	JPN
Rhona	Released: June 20, 2001; Label: Darkchild, Epic; Formats: CD, cassette	37
Instant Classic	Released: October 29, 2024; Label: Butterfly In Flight; Formats: Digital, vinyl	—

=== Singles ===
Title	Year	Peak positions					Album
Title	Year	US Dance	AUS	GER	NL	SWI	Album
"Satisfied"	2001	4	71	77	71	70	Rhona
"The Meaning of Love"	2001	—	—	—	—	—	Rhona
"Letting You Go"	2009	—	—	—	—	—	Non-album singles
"Range"	2009	—	—	—	—	—	Non-album singles
"Take Me There"	2016	—	—	—	—	—	Non-album singles
"In Your Eyes (MMC '89 Version)" (with Arnel Pineda)	2021	—	—	—	—	—	Non-album singles
"We (A Powerful Thing)"	2024	—	—	—	—	—	Instant Classic
"Butterfly"	2024	—	—	—	—	—	Instant Classic
"All on You"	2024	—	—	—	—	—	Instant Classic
"Younity"	2024	—	—	—	—	—	Instant Classic
"It's Christmas Time (For You & I)"	2025	—	—	—	—	—	Non-album singles
"What We Got"	2026	—	—	—	—	—	Non-album singles
"All We Need"	2026	—	—	—	—	—	Non-album singles

== Selected filmography ==
=== Films ===
Title	Year	Role
No Vacancy	1999	Penelope
Malibu's Most Wanted	2003	Sister #2
An En Vogue Christmas	2014	Herself
Coming 2 America	2021	Herself

=== Television series ===
Title	Year	Role	Notes
Brewster Place	1990	Ernestine Dillard Johnson	"Say It Loud" (season 1, episode 10)
Martin	1995	Woman #2	"Ring a Ding, Ding, Gone" (season 4, episode 4)
Living Single	1996	Jordan	"Glass Ceiling" (season 3, episode 26)
Homeboys in Outer Space	1996–1997	Loquatia	21 episodes
The Jamie Foxx Show	1999–2000	Nicole Evans	12 episodes
Second Time Around	2005	Martine	"The Dinner Party" (season 1, episode 13)

== Bibliography ==
- Got Motivation? How To Stay Motivated (2012)
- Find and Pursue Your Passion... Even with a Regular Job (2012)
- Eating Healthier for Less (2013)
- Beyond a Wish – How to Discover the Champion Within (2014)
- Beyond the Fear: Real Stories of Inspiration while facing Illness and Adversity (2015)
- Saving Your Soul (2022)
